

606001–606100 

|-bgcolor=#d6d6d6
| 606001 ||  || — || January 30, 2006 || Kitt Peak || Spacewatch ||  || align=right | 2.3 km || 
|-id=002 bgcolor=#d6d6d6
| 606002 ||  || — || September 9, 2015 || Haleakala || Pan-STARRS ||  || align=right | 3.5 km || 
|-id=003 bgcolor=#d6d6d6
| 606003 ||  || — || December 14, 2010 || Catalina || CSS ||  || align=right | 2.6 km || 
|-id=004 bgcolor=#d6d6d6
| 606004 ||  || — || December 6, 2005 || Mount Lemmon || Mount Lemmon Survey ||  || align=right | 3.4 km || 
|-id=005 bgcolor=#d6d6d6
| 606005 ||  || — || August 3, 2014 || Haleakala || Pan-STARRS ||  || align=right | 2.9 km || 
|-id=006 bgcolor=#d6d6d6
| 606006 ||  || — || March 26, 2006 || Mount Lemmon || Mount Lemmon Survey ||  || align=right | 3.0 km || 
|-id=007 bgcolor=#E9E9E9
| 606007 ||  || — || April 24, 2014 || Mount Lemmon || Mount Lemmon Survey ||  || align=right | 1.2 km || 
|-id=008 bgcolor=#d6d6d6
| 606008 ||  || — || January 6, 2006 || Catalina || CSS ||  || align=right | 3.4 km || 
|-id=009 bgcolor=#d6d6d6
| 606009 ||  || — || January 14, 2011 || Mount Lemmon || Mount Lemmon Survey ||  || align=right | 3.7 km || 
|-id=010 bgcolor=#d6d6d6
| 606010 ||  || — || February 5, 2011 || Catalina || CSS ||  || align=right | 3.6 km || 
|-id=011 bgcolor=#fefefe
| 606011 ||  || — || May 27, 2012 || Kitt Peak || Spacewatch || H || align=right data-sort-value="0.90" | 900 m || 
|-id=012 bgcolor=#d6d6d6
| 606012 ||  || — || January 19, 2012 || Haleakala || Pan-STARRS ||  || align=right | 2.1 km || 
|-id=013 bgcolor=#E9E9E9
| 606013 ||  || — || February 17, 2004 || Kitt Peak || Spacewatch ||  || align=right | 1.4 km || 
|-id=014 bgcolor=#C2FFFF
| 606014 ||  || — || December 20, 2004 || Mount Lemmon || Mount Lemmon Survey || L5 || align=right | 7.7 km || 
|-id=015 bgcolor=#E9E9E9
| 606015 ||  || — || July 29, 2015 || Haleakala || Pan-STARRS ||  || align=right data-sort-value="0.83" | 830 m || 
|-id=016 bgcolor=#d6d6d6
| 606016 ||  || — || January 27, 2017 || Haleakala || Pan-STARRS || 7:4 || align=right | 2.5 km || 
|-id=017 bgcolor=#d6d6d6
| 606017 ||  || — || August 23, 2015 || La Palma || D. Jones, O. Vaduvescu ||  || align=right | 2.1 km || 
|-id=018 bgcolor=#d6d6d6
| 606018 ||  || — || August 16, 2009 || Catalina || CSS || Tj (2.99) || align=right | 3.4 km || 
|-id=019 bgcolor=#d6d6d6
| 606019 ||  || — || November 4, 2004 || Kitt Peak || Spacewatch ||  || align=right | 2.6 km || 
|-id=020 bgcolor=#fefefe
| 606020 ||  || — || February 23, 2017 || Haleakala || Pan-STARRS || H || align=right data-sort-value="0.54" | 540 m || 
|-id=021 bgcolor=#fefefe
| 606021 ||  || — || April 26, 2012 || Haleakala || Pan-STARRS || H || align=right data-sort-value="0.69" | 690 m || 
|-id=022 bgcolor=#d6d6d6
| 606022 ||  || — || September 20, 2003 || Palomar || NEAT ||  || align=right | 4.4 km || 
|-id=023 bgcolor=#d6d6d6
| 606023 ||  || — || December 13, 2015 || Haleakala || Pan-STARRS || 7:4 || align=right | 2.6 km || 
|-id=024 bgcolor=#d6d6d6
| 606024 ||  || — || October 1, 2010 || Catalina || CSS ||  || align=right | 2.5 km || 
|-id=025 bgcolor=#d6d6d6
| 606025 ||  || — || November 9, 2015 || Mount Lemmon || Mount Lemmon Survey ||  || align=right | 2.3 km || 
|-id=026 bgcolor=#d6d6d6
| 606026 ||  || — || October 15, 1999 || Kitt Peak || Spacewatch ||  || align=right | 3.2 km || 
|-id=027 bgcolor=#d6d6d6
| 606027 ||  || — || March 22, 2012 || Mount Lemmon || Mount Lemmon Survey ||  || align=right | 2.6 km || 
|-id=028 bgcolor=#d6d6d6
| 606028 ||  || — || November 12, 2010 || Mount Lemmon || Mount Lemmon Survey ||  || align=right | 3.0 km || 
|-id=029 bgcolor=#d6d6d6
| 606029 ||  || — || October 14, 1999 || Kitt Peak || Spacewatch ||  || align=right | 2.4 km || 
|-id=030 bgcolor=#E9E9E9
| 606030 ||  || — || August 31, 2005 || Kitt Peak || Spacewatch ||  || align=right | 2.3 km || 
|-id=031 bgcolor=#d6d6d6
| 606031 ||  || — || January 11, 2011 || Kitt Peak || Spacewatch ||  || align=right | 2.1 km || 
|-id=032 bgcolor=#E9E9E9
| 606032 ||  || — || February 27, 2008 || Kitt Peak || Spacewatch ||  || align=right | 2.2 km || 
|-id=033 bgcolor=#fefefe
| 606033 ||  || — || January 6, 2010 || Kitt Peak || Spacewatch ||  || align=right data-sort-value="0.84" | 840 m || 
|-id=034 bgcolor=#d6d6d6
| 606034 ||  || — || August 30, 2014 || Mount Lemmon || Mount Lemmon Survey ||  || align=right | 3.8 km || 
|-id=035 bgcolor=#d6d6d6
| 606035 ||  || — || September 4, 2008 || Kitt Peak || Spacewatch || Tj (2.99) || align=right | 3.6 km || 
|-id=036 bgcolor=#fefefe
| 606036 ||  || — || January 26, 2017 || Mount Lemmon || Mount Lemmon Survey || H || align=right data-sort-value="0.66" | 660 m || 
|-id=037 bgcolor=#E9E9E9
| 606037 ||  || — || February 22, 2017 || Mount Lemmon || Mount Lemmon Survey ||  || align=right | 1.9 km || 
|-id=038 bgcolor=#d6d6d6
| 606038 ||  || — || August 15, 2009 || Kitt Peak || Spacewatch ||  || align=right | 3.0 km || 
|-id=039 bgcolor=#E9E9E9
| 606039 ||  || — || February 28, 2003 || Haleakala || AMOS ||  || align=right | 1.7 km || 
|-id=040 bgcolor=#d6d6d6
| 606040 ||  || — || November 9, 2004 || Catalina || CSS ||  || align=right | 3.4 km || 
|-id=041 bgcolor=#d6d6d6
| 606041 ||  || — || December 11, 2010 || Kitt Peak || Spacewatch ||  || align=right | 3.1 km || 
|-id=042 bgcolor=#d6d6d6
| 606042 ||  || — || December 12, 2010 || Mount Lemmon || Mount Lemmon Survey || THB || align=right | 2.6 km || 
|-id=043 bgcolor=#E9E9E9
| 606043 ||  || — || September 30, 2006 || Kitt Peak || Spacewatch ||  || align=right | 1.2 km || 
|-id=044 bgcolor=#d6d6d6
| 606044 ||  || — || December 2, 2010 || Mount Lemmon || Mount Lemmon Survey ||  || align=right | 2.7 km || 
|-id=045 bgcolor=#fefefe
| 606045 ||  || — || February 24, 2012 || Mount Lemmon || Mount Lemmon Survey || H || align=right data-sort-value="0.62" | 620 m || 
|-id=046 bgcolor=#d6d6d6
| 606046 ||  || — || December 10, 2005 || Kitt Peak || Spacewatch ||  || align=right | 3.3 km || 
|-id=047 bgcolor=#d6d6d6
| 606047 ||  || — || February 22, 2017 || Mount Lemmon || Mount Lemmon Survey ||  || align=right | 2.5 km || 
|-id=048 bgcolor=#d6d6d6
| 606048 ||  || — || February 25, 2017 || Haleakala || Pan-STARRS ||  || align=right | 2.0 km || 
|-id=049 bgcolor=#fefefe
| 606049 ||  || — || March 4, 2017 || Mount Lemmon || Mount Lemmon Survey || H || align=right data-sort-value="0.55" | 550 m || 
|-id=050 bgcolor=#fefefe
| 606050 ||  || — || March 6, 2017 || Haleakala || Pan-STARRS || H || align=right data-sort-value="0.53" | 530 m || 
|-id=051 bgcolor=#d6d6d6
| 606051 ||  || — || November 3, 2010 || Mount Lemmon || Mount Lemmon Survey ||  || align=right | 2.7 km || 
|-id=052 bgcolor=#fefefe
| 606052 ||  || — || March 24, 2001 || Anderson Mesa || LONEOS || H || align=right data-sort-value="0.75" | 750 m || 
|-id=053 bgcolor=#d6d6d6
| 606053 ||  || — || October 22, 2003 || Kitt Peak || Spacewatch || Tj (2.92) || align=right | 4.3 km || 
|-id=054 bgcolor=#d6d6d6
| 606054 ||  || — || September 15, 2009 || Kitt Peak || Spacewatch ||  || align=right | 3.2 km || 
|-id=055 bgcolor=#d6d6d6
| 606055 ||  || — || April 19, 2006 || Mount Lemmon || Mount Lemmon Survey ||  || align=right | 3.1 km || 
|-id=056 bgcolor=#d6d6d6
| 606056 ||  || — || September 21, 2009 || Mount Lemmon || Mount Lemmon Survey ||  || align=right | 2.8 km || 
|-id=057 bgcolor=#E9E9E9
| 606057 ||  || — || December 6, 2015 || Mount Lemmon || Mount Lemmon Survey ||  || align=right | 1.3 km || 
|-id=058 bgcolor=#d6d6d6
| 606058 ||  || — || March 7, 2017 || Mount Lemmon || Mount Lemmon Survey || 3:2 || align=right | 3.6 km || 
|-id=059 bgcolor=#d6d6d6
| 606059 ||  || — || March 4, 2017 || Kitt Peak || Spacewatch ||  || align=right | 2.4 km || 
|-id=060 bgcolor=#d6d6d6
| 606060 ||  || — || March 4, 2017 || Mount Lemmon || Mount Lemmon Survey ||  || align=right | 3.0 km || 
|-id=061 bgcolor=#E9E9E9
| 606061 ||  || — || March 5, 2017 || Haleakala || Pan-STARRS ||  || align=right | 1.2 km || 
|-id=062 bgcolor=#fefefe
| 606062 ||  || — || September 1, 2010 || Mount Lemmon || Mount Lemmon Survey || H || align=right data-sort-value="0.54" | 540 m || 
|-id=063 bgcolor=#fefefe
| 606063 ||  || — || September 15, 2010 || Mount Lemmon || Mount Lemmon Survey || H || align=right data-sort-value="0.75" | 750 m || 
|-id=064 bgcolor=#d6d6d6
| 606064 ||  || — || September 17, 2015 || Catalina || CSS ||  || align=right | 2.8 km || 
|-id=065 bgcolor=#d6d6d6
| 606065 ||  || — || September 19, 2009 || Kitt Peak || Spacewatch ||  || align=right | 2.5 km || 
|-id=066 bgcolor=#d6d6d6
| 606066 ||  || — || November 23, 2015 || Mount Lemmon || Mount Lemmon Survey ||  || align=right | 1.9 km || 
|-id=067 bgcolor=#E9E9E9
| 606067 ||  || — || November 13, 2007 || Mount Lemmon || Mount Lemmon Survey ||  || align=right data-sort-value="0.66" | 660 m || 
|-id=068 bgcolor=#d6d6d6
| 606068 ||  || — || March 27, 2012 || Mount Lemmon || Mount Lemmon Survey ||  || align=right | 2.6 km || 
|-id=069 bgcolor=#d6d6d6
| 606069 ||  || — || September 18, 2014 || Haleakala || Pan-STARRS ||  || align=right | 1.8 km || 
|-id=070 bgcolor=#d6d6d6
| 606070 ||  || — || March 5, 2006 || Kitt Peak || Spacewatch ||  || align=right | 2.6 km || 
|-id=071 bgcolor=#d6d6d6
| 606071 ||  || — || November 2, 2015 || Haleakala || Pan-STARRS ||  || align=right | 2.5 km || 
|-id=072 bgcolor=#d6d6d6
| 606072 ||  || — || October 10, 2005 || Kitt Peak || Spacewatch ||  || align=right | 1.8 km || 
|-id=073 bgcolor=#fefefe
| 606073 ||  || — || March 2, 2006 || Catalina || CSS || H || align=right data-sort-value="0.77" | 770 m || 
|-id=074 bgcolor=#E9E9E9
| 606074 ||  || — || January 24, 2007 || Mount Lemmon || Mount Lemmon Survey || AGN || align=right | 1.4 km || 
|-id=075 bgcolor=#E9E9E9
| 606075 ||  || — || September 14, 2005 || Kitt Peak || Spacewatch ||  || align=right | 1.6 km || 
|-id=076 bgcolor=#E9E9E9
| 606076 ||  || — || May 13, 2008 || Kitt Peak || Spacewatch ||  || align=right | 1.8 km || 
|-id=077 bgcolor=#d6d6d6
| 606077 ||  || — || February 12, 2005 || La Silla || A. Boattini || 7:4 || align=right | 4.3 km || 
|-id=078 bgcolor=#d6d6d6
| 606078 ||  || — || May 21, 2012 || Mount Lemmon || Mount Lemmon Survey ||  || align=right | 3.2 km || 
|-id=079 bgcolor=#d6d6d6
| 606079 ||  || — || March 31, 2017 || Haleakala || Pan-STARRS ||  || align=right | 2.4 km || 
|-id=080 bgcolor=#E9E9E9
| 606080 ||  || — || March 20, 2017 || Haleakala || Pan-STARRS ||  || align=right | 1.7 km || 
|-id=081 bgcolor=#E9E9E9
| 606081 ||  || — || October 1, 2010 || Catalina || CSS ||  || align=right | 2.7 km || 
|-id=082 bgcolor=#fefefe
| 606082 ||  || — || November 8, 2010 || Catalina || CSS || H || align=right data-sort-value="0.79" | 790 m || 
|-id=083 bgcolor=#fefefe
| 606083 ||  || — || August 6, 2015 || Haleakala || Pan-STARRS || H || align=right data-sort-value="0.58" | 580 m || 
|-id=084 bgcolor=#fefefe
| 606084 ||  || — || January 27, 2006 || Catalina || CSS || H || align=right data-sort-value="0.85" | 850 m || 
|-id=085 bgcolor=#FA8072
| 606085 ||  || — || June 5, 2014 || Haleakala || Pan-STARRS ||  || align=right data-sort-value="0.80" | 800 m || 
|-id=086 bgcolor=#d6d6d6
| 606086 ||  || — || December 17, 2004 || Socorro || LINEAR || Tj (2.95) || align=right | 3.1 km || 
|-id=087 bgcolor=#fefefe
| 606087 ||  || — || April 1, 2017 || Haleakala || Pan-STARRS ||  || align=right data-sort-value="0.46" | 460 m || 
|-id=088 bgcolor=#fefefe
| 606088 ||  || — || January 23, 2011 || Mount Lemmon || Mount Lemmon Survey || H || align=right data-sort-value="0.79" | 790 m || 
|-id=089 bgcolor=#d6d6d6
| 606089 ||  || — || May 9, 2007 || Mount Lemmon || Mount Lemmon Survey ||  || align=right | 1.7 km || 
|-id=090 bgcolor=#fefefe
| 606090 ||  || — || October 25, 2008 || Kitt Peak || Spacewatch ||  || align=right data-sort-value="0.76" | 760 m || 
|-id=091 bgcolor=#d6d6d6
| 606091 ||  || — || October 25, 2013 || Mount Lemmon || Mount Lemmon Survey || 3:2 || align=right | 3.8 km || 
|-id=092 bgcolor=#d6d6d6
| 606092 ||  || — || March 3, 2009 || Mount Lemmon || Mount Lemmon Survey || 3:2 || align=right | 3.9 km || 
|-id=093 bgcolor=#fefefe
| 606093 ||  || — || March 22, 2017 || Haleakala || Pan-STARRS ||  || align=right data-sort-value="0.81" | 810 m || 
|-id=094 bgcolor=#d6d6d6
| 606094 ||  || — || September 2, 2013 || Mount Lemmon || Mount Lemmon Survey ||  || align=right | 2.2 km || 
|-id=095 bgcolor=#d6d6d6
| 606095 ||  || — || November 8, 2008 || Mount Lemmon || Mount Lemmon Survey ||  || align=right | 2.8 km || 
|-id=096 bgcolor=#d6d6d6
| 606096 ||  || — || April 30, 2017 || Mount Lemmon || Mount Lemmon Survey ||  || align=right | 2.2 km || 
|-id=097 bgcolor=#E9E9E9
| 606097 ||  || — || April 26, 2017 || Haleakala || Pan-STARRS ||  || align=right | 1.6 km || 
|-id=098 bgcolor=#d6d6d6
| 606098 ||  || — || January 16, 2011 || Mount Lemmon || Mount Lemmon Survey ||  || align=right | 2.8 km || 
|-id=099 bgcolor=#fefefe
| 606099 ||  || — || April 29, 2001 || Kitt Peak || Spacewatch || H || align=right data-sort-value="0.69" | 690 m || 
|-id=100 bgcolor=#fefefe
| 606100 ||  || — || May 22, 2017 || Haleakala || Pan-STARRS || H || align=right data-sort-value="0.63" | 630 m || 
|}

606101–606200 

|-bgcolor=#d6d6d6
| 606101 ||  || — || December 29, 2014 || Mount Lemmon || Mount Lemmon Survey || 3:2 || align=right | 4.4 km || 
|-id=102 bgcolor=#fefefe
| 606102 ||  || — || July 27, 2014 || Haleakala || Pan-STARRS ||  || align=right data-sort-value="0.49" | 490 m || 
|-id=103 bgcolor=#d6d6d6
| 606103 ||  || — || April 4, 2017 || Haleakala || Pan-STARRS ||  || align=right | 2.3 km || 
|-id=104 bgcolor=#fefefe
| 606104 ||  || — || June 19, 2009 || Kitt Peak || Spacewatch || H || align=right data-sort-value="0.57" | 570 m || 
|-id=105 bgcolor=#d6d6d6
| 606105 ||  || — || August 16, 2007 || XuYi || PMO NEO ||  || align=right | 3.5 km || 
|-id=106 bgcolor=#FA8072
| 606106 ||  || — || March 14, 2007 || Kitt Peak || Spacewatch ||  || align=right data-sort-value="0.45" | 450 m || 
|-id=107 bgcolor=#d6d6d6
| 606107 ||  || — || September 20, 2007 || Kitt Peak || Spacewatch ||  || align=right | 3.0 km || 
|-id=108 bgcolor=#d6d6d6
| 606108 ||  || — || November 27, 2014 || Mount Lemmon || Mount Lemmon Survey ||  || align=right | 3.0 km || 
|-id=109 bgcolor=#fefefe
| 606109 ||  || — || June 25, 2014 || Mount Lemmon || Mount Lemmon Survey ||  || align=right data-sort-value="0.52" | 520 m || 
|-id=110 bgcolor=#d6d6d6
| 606110 ||  || — || December 29, 2014 || Haleakala || Pan-STARRS ||  || align=right | 3.2 km || 
|-id=111 bgcolor=#d6d6d6
| 606111 ||  || — || November 16, 2009 || Mount Lemmon || Mount Lemmon Survey ||  || align=right | 2.9 km || 
|-id=112 bgcolor=#d6d6d6
| 606112 ||  || — || April 27, 2000 || Kitt Peak || Spacewatch ||  || align=right | 2.8 km || 
|-id=113 bgcolor=#fefefe
| 606113 ||  || — || December 30, 2013 || Mount Lemmon || Mount Lemmon Survey || H || align=right data-sort-value="0.59" | 590 m || 
|-id=114 bgcolor=#d6d6d6
| 606114 ||  || — || October 20, 2007 || Mount Lemmon || Mount Lemmon Survey ||  || align=right | 2.4 km || 
|-id=115 bgcolor=#fefefe
| 606115 ||  || — || February 28, 2014 || Haleakala || Pan-STARRS || H || align=right data-sort-value="0.57" | 570 m || 
|-id=116 bgcolor=#fefefe
| 606116 ||  || — || June 21, 2010 || Mount Lemmon || Mount Lemmon Survey ||  || align=right data-sort-value="0.54" | 540 m || 
|-id=117 bgcolor=#d6d6d6
| 606117 ||  || — || April 6, 2011 || Mount Lemmon || Mount Lemmon Survey ||  || align=right | 2.9 km || 
|-id=118 bgcolor=#d6d6d6
| 606118 ||  || — || June 25, 2017 || Haleakala || Pan-STARRS ||  || align=right | 2.2 km || 
|-id=119 bgcolor=#d6d6d6
| 606119 ||  || — || June 22, 2017 || Haleakala || Pan-STARRS ||  || align=right | 1.7 km || 
|-id=120 bgcolor=#d6d6d6
| 606120 ||  || — || August 21, 2006 || Kitt Peak || Spacewatch || Tj (2.98) || align=right | 3.4 km || 
|-id=121 bgcolor=#E9E9E9
| 606121 ||  || — || June 1, 2012 || Mount Lemmon || Mount Lemmon Survey ||  || align=right | 1.9 km || 
|-id=122 bgcolor=#fefefe
| 606122 ||  || — || October 20, 2011 || Mount Lemmon || Mount Lemmon Survey ||  || align=right data-sort-value="0.55" | 550 m || 
|-id=123 bgcolor=#fefefe
| 606123 ||  || — || April 11, 2013 || Kitt Peak || Spacewatch ||  || align=right data-sort-value="0.74" | 740 m || 
|-id=124 bgcolor=#fefefe
| 606124 ||  || — || September 29, 2010 || Mount Lemmon || Mount Lemmon Survey ||  || align=right data-sort-value="0.62" | 620 m || 
|-id=125 bgcolor=#fefefe
| 606125 ||  || — || August 17, 2006 || Palomar || NEAT ||  || align=right data-sort-value="0.60" | 600 m || 
|-id=126 bgcolor=#E9E9E9
| 606126 ||  || — || May 17, 2012 || Mount Lemmon || Mount Lemmon Survey ||  || align=right | 1.3 km || 
|-id=127 bgcolor=#fefefe
| 606127 ||  || — || July 22, 2010 || Crni Vrh || S. Matičič ||  || align=right data-sort-value="0.79" | 790 m || 
|-id=128 bgcolor=#d6d6d6
| 606128 ||  || — || October 31, 2002 || Palomar || NEAT || 3:2 || align=right | 3.4 km || 
|-id=129 bgcolor=#fefefe
| 606129 ||  || — || January 20, 2009 || Kitt Peak || Spacewatch ||  || align=right data-sort-value="0.62" | 620 m || 
|-id=130 bgcolor=#fefefe
| 606130 ||  || — || September 18, 2006 || Apache Point || SDSS Collaboration ||  || align=right data-sort-value="0.67" | 670 m || 
|-id=131 bgcolor=#E9E9E9
| 606131 ||  || — || January 12, 2011 || Mount Lemmon || Mount Lemmon Survey ||  || align=right | 1.3 km || 
|-id=132 bgcolor=#fefefe
| 606132 ||  || — || January 18, 2012 || Mount Lemmon || Mount Lemmon Survey ||  || align=right data-sort-value="0.65" | 650 m || 
|-id=133 bgcolor=#fefefe
| 606133 ||  || — || November 1, 2007 || Kitt Peak || Spacewatch ||  || align=right data-sort-value="0.57" | 570 m || 
|-id=134 bgcolor=#fefefe
| 606134 ||  || — || August 27, 2014 || Haleakala || Pan-STARRS ||  || align=right data-sort-value="0.49" | 490 m || 
|-id=135 bgcolor=#fefefe
| 606135 ||  || — || April 11, 2013 || Mount Lemmon || Mount Lemmon Survey ||  || align=right data-sort-value="0.58" | 580 m || 
|-id=136 bgcolor=#fefefe
| 606136 ||  || — || February 19, 2009 || Mount Lemmon || Mount Lemmon Survey ||  || align=right data-sort-value="0.72" | 720 m || 
|-id=137 bgcolor=#fefefe
| 606137 ||  || — || October 16, 2014 || Mount Lemmon || Mount Lemmon Survey ||  || align=right data-sort-value="0.67" | 670 m || 
|-id=138 bgcolor=#fefefe
| 606138 ||  || — || December 15, 2007 || Kitt Peak || Spacewatch ||  || align=right data-sort-value="0.91" | 910 m || 
|-id=139 bgcolor=#fefefe
| 606139 ||  || — || July 18, 2007 || Mount Lemmon || Mount Lemmon Survey ||  || align=right data-sort-value="0.76" | 760 m || 
|-id=140 bgcolor=#FA8072
| 606140 ||  || — || December 18, 2007 || Piszkesteto || K. Sárneczky ||  || align=right data-sort-value="0.72" | 720 m || 
|-id=141 bgcolor=#fefefe
| 606141 ||  || — || March 10, 2005 || Mount Lemmon || Mount Lemmon Survey ||  || align=right data-sort-value="0.67" | 670 m || 
|-id=142 bgcolor=#E9E9E9
| 606142 ||  || — || July 28, 2008 || Siding Spring || SSS ||  || align=right | 1.2 km || 
|-id=143 bgcolor=#E9E9E9
| 606143 ||  || — || April 2, 2016 || Haleakala || Pan-STARRS ||  || align=right | 2.4 km || 
|-id=144 bgcolor=#fefefe
| 606144 ||  || — || September 16, 2003 || Kitt Peak || Spacewatch ||  || align=right data-sort-value="0.58" | 580 m || 
|-id=145 bgcolor=#FA8072
| 606145 ||  || — || February 1, 2006 || Kitt Peak || Spacewatch ||  || align=right data-sort-value="0.62" | 620 m || 
|-id=146 bgcolor=#fefefe
| 606146 ||  || — || March 26, 2009 || Mount Lemmon || Mount Lemmon Survey ||  || align=right data-sort-value="0.63" | 630 m || 
|-id=147 bgcolor=#fefefe
| 606147 ||  || — || October 17, 2010 || Mount Lemmon || Mount Lemmon Survey ||  || align=right data-sort-value="0.73" | 730 m || 
|-id=148 bgcolor=#d6d6d6
| 606148 ||  || — || October 27, 2012 || Mount Lemmon || Mount Lemmon Survey ||  || align=right | 2.3 km || 
|-id=149 bgcolor=#fefefe
| 606149 ||  || — || June 23, 2017 || Haleakala || Pan-STARRS || H || align=right data-sort-value="0.58" | 580 m || 
|-id=150 bgcolor=#fefefe
| 606150 ||  || — || July 30, 2017 || Haleakala || Pan-STARRS ||  || align=right data-sort-value="0.56" | 560 m || 
|-id=151 bgcolor=#d6d6d6
| 606151 ||  || — || July 25, 2017 || Haleakala || Pan-STARRS ||  || align=right | 2.1 km || 
|-id=152 bgcolor=#fefefe
| 606152 ||  || — || July 30, 2017 || Haleakala || Pan-STARRS ||  || align=right data-sort-value="0.56" | 560 m || 
|-id=153 bgcolor=#fefefe
| 606153 ||  || — || December 28, 2014 || Mount Lemmon || Mount Lemmon Survey ||  || align=right data-sort-value="0.61" | 610 m || 
|-id=154 bgcolor=#fefefe
| 606154 ||  || — || September 30, 2010 || Mount Lemmon || Mount Lemmon Survey ||  || align=right data-sort-value="0.57" | 570 m || 
|-id=155 bgcolor=#d6d6d6
| 606155 ||  || — || February 21, 2001 || Kitt Peak || Spacewatch ||  || align=right | 2.2 km || 
|-id=156 bgcolor=#fefefe
| 606156 ||  || — || April 2, 2005 || Kitt Peak || Spacewatch ||  || align=right data-sort-value="0.57" | 570 m || 
|-id=157 bgcolor=#fefefe
| 606157 ||  || — || September 27, 1995 || Kitt Peak || Spacewatch ||  || align=right data-sort-value="0.54" | 540 m || 
|-id=158 bgcolor=#fefefe
| 606158 ||  || — || July 1, 2013 || Haleakala || Pan-STARRS ||  || align=right data-sort-value="0.62" | 620 m || 
|-id=159 bgcolor=#fefefe
| 606159 ||  || — || April 4, 2005 || Mount Lemmon || Mount Lemmon Survey ||  || align=right data-sort-value="0.69" | 690 m || 
|-id=160 bgcolor=#fefefe
| 606160 ||  || — || September 21, 2003 || Kitt Peak || Spacewatch ||  || align=right data-sort-value="0.59" | 590 m || 
|-id=161 bgcolor=#fefefe
| 606161 ||  || — || September 19, 2006 || Catalina || CSS ||  || align=right data-sort-value="0.79" | 790 m || 
|-id=162 bgcolor=#d6d6d6
| 606162 ||  || — || February 15, 2015 || Haleakala || Pan-STARRS ||  || align=right | 2.4 km || 
|-id=163 bgcolor=#fefefe
| 606163 ||  || — || January 30, 2016 || Mount Lemmon || Mount Lemmon Survey ||  || align=right data-sort-value="0.63" | 630 m || 
|-id=164 bgcolor=#E9E9E9
| 606164 ||  || — || July 16, 2013 || Haleakala || Pan-STARRS ||  || align=right | 1.9 km || 
|-id=165 bgcolor=#E9E9E9
| 606165 ||  || — || November 25, 2005 || Mount Lemmon || Mount Lemmon Survey ||  || align=right | 1.2 km || 
|-id=166 bgcolor=#d6d6d6
| 606166 ||  || — || January 2, 2009 || Mount Lemmon || Mount Lemmon Survey ||  || align=right | 2.3 km || 
|-id=167 bgcolor=#fefefe
| 606167 ||  || — || May 7, 2010 || Mount Lemmon || Mount Lemmon Survey ||  || align=right data-sort-value="0.65" | 650 m || 
|-id=168 bgcolor=#fefefe
| 606168 ||  || — || May 1, 2003 || Kitt Peak || Spacewatch ||  || align=right data-sort-value="0.71" | 710 m || 
|-id=169 bgcolor=#fefefe
| 606169 ||  || — || March 26, 2006 || Mount Lemmon || Mount Lemmon Survey ||  || align=right data-sort-value="0.62" | 620 m || 
|-id=170 bgcolor=#E9E9E9
| 606170 ||  || — || November 25, 2005 || Kitt Peak || Spacewatch ||  || align=right | 1.8 km || 
|-id=171 bgcolor=#d6d6d6
| 606171 ||  || — || August 1, 2017 || Haleakala || Pan-STARRS ||  || align=right | 2.3 km || 
|-id=172 bgcolor=#fefefe
| 606172 ||  || — || August 3, 2017 || Haleakala || Pan-STARRS ||  || align=right data-sort-value="0.59" | 590 m || 
|-id=173 bgcolor=#fefefe
| 606173 ||  || — || December 19, 2004 || Mount Lemmon || Mount Lemmon Survey ||  || align=right data-sort-value="0.55" | 550 m || 
|-id=174 bgcolor=#fefefe
| 606174 ||  || — || September 6, 2010 || Piszkesteto || Z. Kuli ||  || align=right data-sort-value="0.53" | 530 m || 
|-id=175 bgcolor=#fefefe
| 606175 ||  || — || April 9, 2010 || Mount Lemmon || Mount Lemmon Survey ||  || align=right data-sort-value="0.50" | 500 m || 
|-id=176 bgcolor=#fefefe
| 606176 ||  || — || October 20, 2003 || Kitt Peak || Spacewatch ||  || align=right data-sort-value="0.52" | 520 m || 
|-id=177 bgcolor=#d6d6d6
| 606177 ||  || — || September 19, 2006 || Kitt Peak || Spacewatch ||  || align=right | 2.2 km || 
|-id=178 bgcolor=#fefefe
| 606178 ||  || — || January 22, 2006 || Mount Lemmon || Mount Lemmon Survey ||  || align=right data-sort-value="0.61" | 610 m || 
|-id=179 bgcolor=#fefefe
| 606179 ||  || — || October 26, 2011 || Haleakala || Pan-STARRS ||  || align=right data-sort-value="0.51" | 510 m || 
|-id=180 bgcolor=#fefefe
| 606180 ||  || — || October 30, 2011 || Kitt Peak || Spacewatch ||  || align=right data-sort-value="0.58" | 580 m || 
|-id=181 bgcolor=#fefefe
| 606181 ||  || — || October 19, 2003 || Apache Point || SDSS Collaboration ||  || align=right data-sort-value="0.65" | 650 m || 
|-id=182 bgcolor=#E9E9E9
| 606182 ||  || — || April 20, 2012 || Mount Lemmon || Mount Lemmon Survey ||  || align=right | 1.1 km || 
|-id=183 bgcolor=#fefefe
| 606183 ||  || — || December 22, 2008 || Kitt Peak || Spacewatch ||  || align=right data-sort-value="0.62" | 620 m || 
|-id=184 bgcolor=#fefefe
| 606184 ||  || — || September 19, 2014 || Haleakala || Pan-STARRS ||  || align=right data-sort-value="0.77" | 770 m || 
|-id=185 bgcolor=#d6d6d6
| 606185 ||  || — || November 9, 2013 || Haleakala || Pan-STARRS ||  || align=right | 1.8 km || 
|-id=186 bgcolor=#E9E9E9
| 606186 ||  || — || October 2, 2000 || Socorro || LINEAR ||  || align=right | 1.5 km || 
|-id=187 bgcolor=#C2E0FF
| 606187 ||  || — || August 16, 2017 || Haleakala || Pan-STARRS || damocloid || align=right | 8.2 km || 
|-id=188 bgcolor=#E9E9E9
| 606188 ||  || — || November 10, 2005 || Catalina || CSS ||  || align=right data-sort-value="0.70" | 700 m || 
|-id=189 bgcolor=#fefefe
| 606189 ||  || — || January 4, 2016 || Haleakala || Pan-STARRS ||  || align=right data-sort-value="0.62" | 620 m || 
|-id=190 bgcolor=#E9E9E9
| 606190 ||  || — || February 5, 2011 || Haleakala || Pan-STARRS ||  || align=right | 1.7 km || 
|-id=191 bgcolor=#fefefe
| 606191 ||  || — || May 1, 2013 || Mount Lemmon || Mount Lemmon Survey ||  || align=right data-sort-value="0.48" | 480 m || 
|-id=192 bgcolor=#fefefe
| 606192 ||  || — || July 4, 2010 || Kitt Peak || Spacewatch ||  || align=right data-sort-value="0.92" | 920 m || 
|-id=193 bgcolor=#d6d6d6
| 606193 ||  || — || October 20, 2007 || Mount Lemmon || Mount Lemmon Survey ||  || align=right | 2.1 km || 
|-id=194 bgcolor=#E9E9E9
| 606194 ||  || — || April 5, 2011 || Mount Lemmon || Mount Lemmon Survey ||  || align=right | 1.5 km || 
|-id=195 bgcolor=#fefefe
| 606195 ||  || — || December 29, 2011 || Mount Lemmon || Mount Lemmon Survey ||  || align=right data-sort-value="0.54" | 540 m || 
|-id=196 bgcolor=#E9E9E9
| 606196 ||  || — || December 19, 2009 || Mount Lemmon || Mount Lemmon Survey ||  || align=right | 1.4 km || 
|-id=197 bgcolor=#fefefe
| 606197 ||  || — || June 20, 2006 || Mount Lemmon || Mount Lemmon Survey ||  || align=right data-sort-value="0.54" | 540 m || 
|-id=198 bgcolor=#d6d6d6
| 606198 ||  || — || September 17, 1995 || Kitt Peak || Spacewatch ||  || align=right | 2.5 km || 
|-id=199 bgcolor=#E9E9E9
| 606199 ||  || — || January 21, 2015 || Haleakala || Pan-STARRS ||  || align=right | 1.8 km || 
|-id=200 bgcolor=#fefefe
| 606200 ||  || — || November 16, 2006 || Mount Lemmon || Mount Lemmon Survey ||  || align=right data-sort-value="0.61" | 610 m || 
|}

606201–606300 

|-bgcolor=#fefefe
| 606201 ||  || — || October 16, 2014 || Nogales || M. Schwartz, P. R. Holvorcem ||  || align=right data-sort-value="0.66" | 660 m || 
|-id=202 bgcolor=#fefefe
| 606202 ||  || — || June 18, 2013 || Mount Lemmon || Mount Lemmon Survey ||  || align=right data-sort-value="0.65" | 650 m || 
|-id=203 bgcolor=#fefefe
| 606203 ||  || — || March 1, 2005 || Kitt Peak || Spacewatch ||  || align=right data-sort-value="0.80" | 800 m || 
|-id=204 bgcolor=#fefefe
| 606204 ||  || — || January 19, 2012 || Haleakala || Pan-STARRS ||  || align=right data-sort-value="0.72" | 720 m || 
|-id=205 bgcolor=#d6d6d6
| 606205 ||  || — || October 10, 2012 || Haleakala || Pan-STARRS ||  || align=right | 2.4 km || 
|-id=206 bgcolor=#fefefe
| 606206 ||  || — || August 7, 2010 || XuYi || PMO NEO ||  || align=right data-sort-value="0.75" | 750 m || 
|-id=207 bgcolor=#E9E9E9
| 606207 ||  || — || May 29, 2008 || Mount Lemmon || Mount Lemmon Survey ||  || align=right | 2.4 km || 
|-id=208 bgcolor=#E9E9E9
| 606208 ||  || — || March 6, 2011 || Mount Lemmon || Mount Lemmon Survey ||  || align=right | 1.8 km || 
|-id=209 bgcolor=#d6d6d6
| 606209 ||  || — || January 11, 2014 || Mauna Kea || M. C. Kotson, D. J. Tholen ||  || align=right | 3.0 km || 
|-id=210 bgcolor=#d6d6d6
| 606210 ||  || — || August 24, 2017 || Haleakala || Pan-STARRS ||  || align=right | 2.1 km || 
|-id=211 bgcolor=#fefefe
| 606211 ||  || — || December 9, 2012 || Catalina || CSS || H || align=right data-sort-value="0.73" | 730 m || 
|-id=212 bgcolor=#FA8072
| 606212 ||  || — || December 10, 2010 || Socorro || LINEAR ||  || align=right | 1.0 km || 
|-id=213 bgcolor=#fefefe
| 606213 ||  || — || July 14, 2013 || Haleakala || Pan-STARRS ||  || align=right data-sort-value="0.65" | 650 m || 
|-id=214 bgcolor=#d6d6d6
| 606214 ||  || — || November 17, 2008 || Kitt Peak || Spacewatch ||  || align=right | 1.6 km || 
|-id=215 bgcolor=#fefefe
| 606215 ||  || — || October 26, 2014 || Mount Lemmon || Mount Lemmon Survey ||  || align=right data-sort-value="0.68" | 680 m || 
|-id=216 bgcolor=#fefefe
| 606216 ||  || — || February 6, 2008 || Kitt Peak || Spacewatch ||  || align=right data-sort-value="0.70" | 700 m || 
|-id=217 bgcolor=#E9E9E9
| 606217 ||  || — || October 24, 2013 || Mount Lemmon || Mount Lemmon Survey ||  || align=right | 1.7 km || 
|-id=218 bgcolor=#fefefe
| 606218 ||  || — || August 13, 2010 || Kitt Peak || Spacewatch ||  || align=right data-sort-value="0.71" | 710 m || 
|-id=219 bgcolor=#fefefe
| 606219 ||  || — || August 15, 2004 || Cerro Tololo || Cerro Tololo Obs. ||  || align=right data-sort-value="0.75" | 750 m || 
|-id=220 bgcolor=#fefefe
| 606220 ||  || — || February 28, 2009 || Kitt Peak || Spacewatch ||  || align=right data-sort-value="0.71" | 710 m || 
|-id=221 bgcolor=#fefefe
| 606221 ||  || — || April 21, 2009 || Mount Lemmon || Mount Lemmon Survey ||  || align=right data-sort-value="0.67" | 670 m || 
|-id=222 bgcolor=#fefefe
| 606222 ||  || — || April 10, 2005 || Mount Lemmon || Mount Lemmon Survey ||  || align=right data-sort-value="0.57" | 570 m || 
|-id=223 bgcolor=#fefefe
| 606223 ||  || — || March 10, 2005 || Mount Lemmon || Mount Lemmon Survey ||  || align=right data-sort-value="0.82" | 820 m || 
|-id=224 bgcolor=#d6d6d6
| 606224 ||  || — || January 3, 2014 || Catalina || CSS ||  || align=right | 2.6 km || 
|-id=225 bgcolor=#fefefe
| 606225 ||  || — || November 29, 2014 || Kitt Peak || Spacewatch ||  || align=right data-sort-value="0.70" | 700 m || 
|-id=226 bgcolor=#fefefe
| 606226 ||  || — || October 30, 2007 || Mount Lemmon || Mount Lemmon Survey ||  || align=right data-sort-value="0.76" | 760 m || 
|-id=227 bgcolor=#fefefe
| 606227 ||  || — || October 19, 2006 || Kitt Peak || L. H. Wasserman ||  || align=right data-sort-value="0.55" | 550 m || 
|-id=228 bgcolor=#fefefe
| 606228 ||  || — || February 1, 2012 || Mount Lemmon || Mount Lemmon Survey ||  || align=right data-sort-value="0.61" | 610 m || 
|-id=229 bgcolor=#fefefe
| 606229 ||  || — || February 8, 2008 || Kitt Peak || Spacewatch ||  || align=right data-sort-value="0.70" | 700 m || 
|-id=230 bgcolor=#fefefe
| 606230 ||  || — || September 15, 2010 || Kitt Peak || Spacewatch ||  || align=right data-sort-value="0.82" | 820 m || 
|-id=231 bgcolor=#fefefe
| 606231 ||  || — || September 26, 2006 || Kitt Peak || Spacewatch ||  || align=right data-sort-value="0.62" | 620 m || 
|-id=232 bgcolor=#d6d6d6
| 606232 ||  || — || August 17, 2012 || Haleakala || Pan-STARRS ||  || align=right | 1.7 km || 
|-id=233 bgcolor=#fefefe
| 606233 ||  || — || July 15, 2013 || Haleakala || Pan-STARRS ||  || align=right data-sort-value="0.62" | 620 m || 
|-id=234 bgcolor=#d6d6d6
| 606234 ||  || — || September 25, 2006 || Mount Lemmon || Mount Lemmon Survey ||  || align=right | 2.5 km || 
|-id=235 bgcolor=#fefefe
| 606235 ||  || — || February 24, 2012 || Mount Lemmon || Mount Lemmon Survey ||  || align=right data-sort-value="0.64" | 640 m || 
|-id=236 bgcolor=#d6d6d6
| 606236 ||  || — || October 10, 2012 || Mount Lemmon || Mount Lemmon Survey ||  || align=right | 2.2 km || 
|-id=237 bgcolor=#fefefe
| 606237 ||  || — || August 4, 2013 || Haleakala || Pan-STARRS ||  || align=right data-sort-value="0.48" | 480 m || 
|-id=238 bgcolor=#fefefe
| 606238 ||  || — || March 8, 2008 || Kitt Peak || Spacewatch ||  || align=right data-sort-value="0.52" | 520 m || 
|-id=239 bgcolor=#fefefe
| 606239 ||  || — || November 24, 2014 || Mount Lemmon || Mount Lemmon Survey ||  || align=right data-sort-value="0.55" | 550 m || 
|-id=240 bgcolor=#E9E9E9
| 606240 ||  || — || September 28, 2003 || Anderson Mesa || LONEOS ||  || align=right | 2.1 km || 
|-id=241 bgcolor=#fefefe
| 606241 ||  || — || February 24, 2012 || Kitt Peak || Spacewatch ||  || align=right data-sort-value="0.59" | 590 m || 
|-id=242 bgcolor=#E9E9E9
| 606242 ||  || — || September 6, 2008 || Kitt Peak || Spacewatch ||  || align=right | 1.6 km || 
|-id=243 bgcolor=#fefefe
| 606243 ||  || — || April 15, 2013 || Haleakala || Pan-STARRS ||  || align=right data-sort-value="0.55" | 550 m || 
|-id=244 bgcolor=#d6d6d6
| 606244 ||  || — || February 17, 2015 || Haleakala || Pan-STARRS ||  || align=right | 1.9 km || 
|-id=245 bgcolor=#fefefe
| 606245 ||  || — || May 15, 2005 || Mount Lemmon || Mount Lemmon Survey ||  || align=right data-sort-value="0.66" | 660 m || 
|-id=246 bgcolor=#fefefe
| 606246 ||  || — || November 18, 2007 || Mount Lemmon || Mount Lemmon Survey ||  || align=right data-sort-value="0.63" | 630 m || 
|-id=247 bgcolor=#fefefe
| 606247 ||  || — || October 3, 2006 || Mount Lemmon || Mount Lemmon Survey ||  || align=right data-sort-value="0.62" | 620 m || 
|-id=248 bgcolor=#E9E9E9
| 606248 ||  || — || February 16, 2015 || Haleakala || Pan-STARRS ||  || align=right | 1.9 km || 
|-id=249 bgcolor=#d6d6d6
| 606249 ||  || — || February 26, 2015 || Mount Lemmon || Mount Lemmon Survey ||  || align=right | 2.5 km || 
|-id=250 bgcolor=#d6d6d6
| 606250 ||  || — || September 17, 2012 || Mount Lemmon || Mount Lemmon Survey ||  || align=right | 1.9 km || 
|-id=251 bgcolor=#E9E9E9
| 606251 ||  || — || September 4, 2008 || Kitt Peak || Spacewatch ||  || align=right | 1.9 km || 
|-id=252 bgcolor=#d6d6d6
| 606252 ||  || — || August 21, 2006 || Kitt Peak || Spacewatch ||  || align=right | 2.0 km || 
|-id=253 bgcolor=#fefefe
| 606253 ||  || — || October 28, 2010 || Mount Lemmon || Mount Lemmon Survey ||  || align=right data-sort-value="0.57" | 570 m || 
|-id=254 bgcolor=#fefefe
| 606254 ||  || — || July 14, 2013 || Haleakala || Pan-STARRS ||  || align=right data-sort-value="0.51" | 510 m || 
|-id=255 bgcolor=#fefefe
| 606255 ||  || — || January 3, 2012 || Mount Lemmon || Mount Lemmon Survey ||  || align=right data-sort-value="0.55" | 550 m || 
|-id=256 bgcolor=#fefefe
| 606256 ||  || — || February 9, 2008 || Kitt Peak || Spacewatch ||  || align=right data-sort-value="0.68" | 680 m || 
|-id=257 bgcolor=#fefefe
| 606257 ||  || — || September 16, 2010 || Mount Lemmon || Mount Lemmon Survey ||  || align=right data-sort-value="0.64" | 640 m || 
|-id=258 bgcolor=#fefefe
| 606258 ||  || — || September 18, 2006 || Kitt Peak || Spacewatch ||  || align=right data-sort-value="0.69" | 690 m || 
|-id=259 bgcolor=#E9E9E9
| 606259 ||  || — || September 22, 2003 || Kitt Peak || Spacewatch ||  || align=right | 1.5 km || 
|-id=260 bgcolor=#fefefe
| 606260 ||  || — || March 13, 2013 || Kitt Peak || Spacewatch ||  || align=right data-sort-value="0.63" | 630 m || 
|-id=261 bgcolor=#fefefe
| 606261 ||  || — || March 31, 2009 || Mount Lemmon || Mount Lemmon Survey ||  || align=right data-sort-value="0.62" | 620 m || 
|-id=262 bgcolor=#fefefe
| 606262 ||  || — || September 30, 2006 || Mount Lemmon || Mount Lemmon Survey ||  || align=right data-sort-value="0.65" | 650 m || 
|-id=263 bgcolor=#fefefe
| 606263 ||  || — || September 17, 2006 || Kitt Peak || Spacewatch ||  || align=right data-sort-value="0.64" | 640 m || 
|-id=264 bgcolor=#d6d6d6
| 606264 ||  || — || October 20, 2006 || Mount Lemmon || Mount Lemmon Survey ||  || align=right | 2.3 km || 
|-id=265 bgcolor=#d6d6d6
| 606265 ||  || — || October 21, 2003 || Kitt Peak || Spacewatch ||  || align=right | 2.0 km || 
|-id=266 bgcolor=#fefefe
| 606266 ||  || — || February 13, 2015 || Mount Lemmon || Mount Lemmon Survey ||  || align=right data-sort-value="0.55" | 550 m || 
|-id=267 bgcolor=#E9E9E9
| 606267 ||  || — || October 26, 2013 || Mount Lemmon || Mount Lemmon Survey ||  || align=right | 2.3 km || 
|-id=268 bgcolor=#fefefe
| 606268 ||  || — || December 23, 2014 || Mount Lemmon || Mount Lemmon Survey ||  || align=right data-sort-value="0.61" | 610 m || 
|-id=269 bgcolor=#FA8072
| 606269 ||  || — || April 4, 2008 || Kitt Peak || Spacewatch || H || align=right data-sort-value="0.50" | 500 m || 
|-id=270 bgcolor=#FA8072
| 606270 ||  || — || November 20, 2014 || Mount Lemmon || Mount Lemmon Survey ||  || align=right data-sort-value="0.55" | 550 m || 
|-id=271 bgcolor=#fefefe
| 606271 ||  || — || August 24, 2006 || Palomar || NEAT ||  || align=right data-sort-value="0.67" | 670 m || 
|-id=272 bgcolor=#fefefe
| 606272 ||  || — || September 11, 2004 || Kitt Peak || Spacewatch ||  || align=right data-sort-value="0.50" | 500 m || 
|-id=273 bgcolor=#fefefe
| 606273 ||  || — || January 19, 2012 || Haleakala || Pan-STARRS ||  || align=right data-sort-value="0.55" | 550 m || 
|-id=274 bgcolor=#d6d6d6
| 606274 ||  || — || February 14, 2013 || Mount Lemmon || Mount Lemmon Survey || 7:4 || align=right | 2.7 km || 
|-id=275 bgcolor=#E9E9E9
| 606275 ||  || — || September 6, 1996 || Kitt Peak || Spacewatch ||  || align=right | 1.2 km || 
|-id=276 bgcolor=#fefefe
| 606276 ||  || — || September 8, 2010 || Kitt Peak || Spacewatch ||  || align=right data-sort-value="0.62" | 620 m || 
|-id=277 bgcolor=#d6d6d6
| 606277 ||  || — || September 21, 2017 || Haleakala || Pan-STARRS ||  || align=right | 2.5 km || 
|-id=278 bgcolor=#d6d6d6
| 606278 ||  || — || December 15, 2001 || Apache Point || SDSS Collaboration ||  || align=right | 3.0 km || 
|-id=279 bgcolor=#d6d6d6
| 606279 ||  || — || September 27, 2006 || Catalina || CSS ||  || align=right | 3.8 km || 
|-id=280 bgcolor=#fefefe
| 606280 ||  || — || September 25, 2006 || Catalina || CSS ||  || align=right data-sort-value="0.77" | 770 m || 
|-id=281 bgcolor=#d6d6d6
| 606281 ||  || — || January 13, 2002 || Palomar || NEAT ||  || align=right | 2.9 km || 
|-id=282 bgcolor=#E9E9E9
| 606282 ||  || — || April 27, 2012 || Haleakala || Pan-STARRS ||  || align=right data-sort-value="0.69" | 690 m || 
|-id=283 bgcolor=#fefefe
| 606283 ||  || — || October 21, 2003 || Palomar || NEAT ||  || align=right data-sort-value="0.81" | 810 m || 
|-id=284 bgcolor=#fefefe
| 606284 ||  || — || July 12, 2013 || Haleakala || Pan-STARRS ||  || align=right data-sort-value="0.56" | 560 m || 
|-id=285 bgcolor=#E9E9E9
| 606285 ||  || — || November 1, 2013 || Kitt Peak || Spacewatch ||  || align=right | 1.5 km || 
|-id=286 bgcolor=#fefefe
| 606286 ||  || — || November 26, 2014 || Mount Lemmon || Mount Lemmon Survey ||  || align=right data-sort-value="0.62" | 620 m || 
|-id=287 bgcolor=#fefefe
| 606287 ||  || — || October 17, 2010 || Mount Lemmon || Mount Lemmon Survey ||  || align=right data-sort-value="0.70" | 700 m || 
|-id=288 bgcolor=#fefefe
| 606288 ||  || — || February 10, 2016 || Haleakala || Pan-STARRS ||  || align=right data-sort-value="0.62" | 620 m || 
|-id=289 bgcolor=#fefefe
| 606289 ||  || — || May 12, 2005 || Mount Lemmon || Mount Lemmon Survey ||  || align=right data-sort-value="0.72" | 720 m || 
|-id=290 bgcolor=#fefefe
| 606290 ||  || — || June 10, 2005 || Kitt Peak || Spacewatch ||  || align=right data-sort-value="0.78" | 780 m || 
|-id=291 bgcolor=#fefefe
| 606291 ||  || — || February 16, 2012 || Haleakala || Pan-STARRS ||  || align=right data-sort-value="0.57" | 570 m || 
|-id=292 bgcolor=#fefefe
| 606292 ||  || — || February 17, 2005 || La Silla || A. Boattini ||  || align=right data-sort-value="0.56" | 560 m || 
|-id=293 bgcolor=#d6d6d6
| 606293 ||  || — || November 9, 2007 || Mount Lemmon || Mount Lemmon Survey ||  || align=right | 2.0 km || 
|-id=294 bgcolor=#fefefe
| 606294 ||  || — || February 10, 2008 || Kitt Peak || Spacewatch ||  || align=right data-sort-value="0.61" | 610 m || 
|-id=295 bgcolor=#d6d6d6
| 606295 ||  || — || November 12, 2013 || Mount Lemmon || Mount Lemmon Survey ||  || align=right | 1.9 km || 
|-id=296 bgcolor=#d6d6d6
| 606296 ||  || — || April 11, 2015 || Mount Lemmon || Mount Lemmon Survey ||  || align=right | 1.7 km || 
|-id=297 bgcolor=#fefefe
| 606297 ||  || — || September 13, 2002 || Palomar || NEAT ||  || align=right data-sort-value="0.64" | 640 m || 
|-id=298 bgcolor=#fefefe
| 606298 ||  || — || June 22, 2009 || Mount Lemmon || Mount Lemmon Survey ||  || align=right data-sort-value="0.55" | 550 m || 
|-id=299 bgcolor=#fefefe
| 606299 ||  || — || October 9, 2010 || Mount Lemmon || Mount Lemmon Survey ||  || align=right data-sort-value="0.62" | 620 m || 
|-id=300 bgcolor=#fefefe
| 606300 ||  || — || October 9, 2004 || Kitt Peak || Spacewatch ||  || align=right data-sort-value="0.56" | 560 m || 
|}

606301–606400 

|-bgcolor=#fefefe
| 606301 ||  || — || December 16, 2014 || Haleakala || Pan-STARRS ||  || align=right data-sort-value="0.66" | 660 m || 
|-id=302 bgcolor=#fefefe
| 606302 ||  || — || November 22, 2014 || Mount Lemmon || Mount Lemmon Survey ||  || align=right data-sort-value="0.82" | 820 m || 
|-id=303 bgcolor=#fefefe
| 606303 ||  || — || December 3, 2005 || Mauna Kea || Mauna Kea Obs. ||  || align=right data-sort-value="0.67" | 670 m || 
|-id=304 bgcolor=#d6d6d6
| 606304 ||  || — || September 15, 2006 || Kitt Peak || Spacewatch ||  || align=right | 2.3 km || 
|-id=305 bgcolor=#fefefe
| 606305 ||  || — || April 27, 2012 || Haleakala || Pan-STARRS ||  || align=right data-sort-value="0.56" | 560 m || 
|-id=306 bgcolor=#fefefe
| 606306 ||  || — || September 14, 2006 || Catalina || CSS ||  || align=right data-sort-value="0.85" | 850 m || 
|-id=307 bgcolor=#E9E9E9
| 606307 ||  || — || January 17, 2015 || Haleakala || Pan-STARRS ||  || align=right | 1.3 km || 
|-id=308 bgcolor=#fefefe
| 606308 ||  || — || April 12, 2005 || Kitt Peak || Spacewatch ||  || align=right data-sort-value="0.65" | 650 m || 
|-id=309 bgcolor=#fefefe
| 606309 ||  || — || March 10, 2005 || Mount Lemmon || Mount Lemmon Survey ||  || align=right data-sort-value="0.69" | 690 m || 
|-id=310 bgcolor=#fefefe
| 606310 ||  || — || June 17, 2013 || Mount Lemmon || Mount Lemmon Survey ||  || align=right data-sort-value="0.69" | 690 m || 
|-id=311 bgcolor=#fefefe
| 606311 ||  || — || April 22, 2009 || Mount Lemmon || Mount Lemmon Survey ||  || align=right data-sort-value="0.73" | 730 m || 
|-id=312 bgcolor=#E9E9E9
| 606312 ||  || — || August 24, 2017 || Haleakala || Pan-STARRS ||  || align=right data-sort-value="0.95" | 950 m || 
|-id=313 bgcolor=#E9E9E9
| 606313 ||  || — || August 16, 2017 || Haleakala || Pan-STARRS ||  || align=right | 1.9 km || 
|-id=314 bgcolor=#E9E9E9
| 606314 ||  || — || October 9, 2008 || Mount Lemmon || Mount Lemmon Survey ||  || align=right | 2.1 km || 
|-id=315 bgcolor=#fefefe
| 606315 ||  || — || September 20, 2007 || Catalina || CSS ||  || align=right data-sort-value="0.74" | 740 m || 
|-id=316 bgcolor=#fefefe
| 606316 ||  || — || March 10, 2005 || Kitt Peak || Spacewatch ||  || align=right data-sort-value="0.85" | 850 m || 
|-id=317 bgcolor=#fefefe
| 606317 ||  || — || September 22, 2003 || Palomar || NEAT ||  || align=right data-sort-value="0.59" | 590 m || 
|-id=318 bgcolor=#fefefe
| 606318 ||  || — || October 2, 2006 || Mount Lemmon || Mount Lemmon Survey ||  || align=right data-sort-value="0.62" | 620 m || 
|-id=319 bgcolor=#fefefe
| 606319 ||  || — || January 31, 2009 || Kitt Peak || Spacewatch ||  || align=right data-sort-value="0.46" | 460 m || 
|-id=320 bgcolor=#fefefe
| 606320 ||  || — || April 16, 2005 || Kitt Peak || Spacewatch ||  || align=right data-sort-value="0.51" | 510 m || 
|-id=321 bgcolor=#fefefe
| 606321 ||  || — || October 2, 2006 || Mount Lemmon || Mount Lemmon Survey ||  || align=right data-sort-value="0.73" | 730 m || 
|-id=322 bgcolor=#fefefe
| 606322 ||  || — || January 19, 2012 || Mount Lemmon || Mount Lemmon Survey ||  || align=right data-sort-value="0.53" | 530 m || 
|-id=323 bgcolor=#E9E9E9
| 606323 ||  || — || May 13, 2007 || Kitt Peak || Spacewatch ||  || align=right | 1.9 km || 
|-id=324 bgcolor=#d6d6d6
| 606324 ||  || — || November 17, 2012 || Mount Lemmon || Mount Lemmon Survey ||  || align=right | 2.6 km || 
|-id=325 bgcolor=#E9E9E9
| 606325 ||  || — || January 27, 2015 || Haleakala || Pan-STARRS ||  || align=right data-sort-value="0.77" | 770 m || 
|-id=326 bgcolor=#fefefe
| 606326 ||  || — || September 25, 2017 || Haleakala || Pan-STARRS || H || align=right data-sort-value="0.39" | 390 m || 
|-id=327 bgcolor=#fefefe
| 606327 ||  || — || September 26, 2017 || Haleakala || Pan-STARRS ||  || align=right data-sort-value="0.48" | 480 m || 
|-id=328 bgcolor=#E9E9E9
| 606328 ||  || — || September 19, 2017 || Haleakala || Pan-STARRS ||  || align=right | 1.8 km || 
|-id=329 bgcolor=#E9E9E9
| 606329 ||  || — || January 23, 2015 || Haleakala || Pan-STARRS ||  || align=right | 1.1 km || 
|-id=330 bgcolor=#fefefe
| 606330 ||  || — || November 4, 2012 || Haleakala || Pan-STARRS || H || align=right data-sort-value="0.58" | 580 m || 
|-id=331 bgcolor=#d6d6d6
| 606331 ||  || — || August 3, 2017 || Haleakala || Pan-STARRS ||  || align=right | 3.3 km || 
|-id=332 bgcolor=#fefefe
| 606332 ||  || — || October 12, 2017 || Mount Lemmon || Mount Lemmon Survey ||  || align=right data-sort-value="0.73" | 730 m || 
|-id=333 bgcolor=#d6d6d6
| 606333 ||  || — || September 2, 2005 || Palomar || NEAT || Tj (2.9) || align=right | 4.5 km || 
|-id=334 bgcolor=#fefefe
| 606334 ||  || — || March 29, 2011 || Mount Lemmon || Mount Lemmon Survey || H || align=right data-sort-value="0.56" | 560 m || 
|-id=335 bgcolor=#FA8072
| 606335 ||  || — || May 1, 2006 || Mauna Kea || Mauna Kea Obs. ||  || align=right data-sort-value="0.56" | 560 m || 
|-id=336 bgcolor=#fefefe
| 606336 ||  || — || June 15, 2006 || Kitt Peak || Spacewatch ||  || align=right data-sort-value="0.86" | 860 m || 
|-id=337 bgcolor=#fefefe
| 606337 ||  || — || October 19, 2003 || Palomar || NEAT ||  || align=right data-sort-value="0.89" | 890 m || 
|-id=338 bgcolor=#fefefe
| 606338 ||  || — || October 9, 2007 || Kitt Peak || Spacewatch ||  || align=right data-sort-value="0.75" | 750 m || 
|-id=339 bgcolor=#fefefe
| 606339 Kierpiec ||  ||  || October 24, 2014 || Tincana || M. Żołnowski, M. Kusiak ||  || align=right data-sort-value="0.49" | 490 m || 
|-id=340 bgcolor=#fefefe
| 606340 ||  || — || November 17, 2014 || Mount Lemmon || Mount Lemmon Survey ||  || align=right data-sort-value="0.43" | 430 m || 
|-id=341 bgcolor=#E9E9E9
| 606341 ||  || — || October 2, 2003 || Kitt Peak || Spacewatch ||  || align=right | 2.1 km || 
|-id=342 bgcolor=#fefefe
| 606342 ||  || — || August 14, 2013 || Haleakala || Pan-STARRS ||  || align=right data-sort-value="0.61" | 610 m || 
|-id=343 bgcolor=#fefefe
| 606343 ||  || — || August 4, 2013 || Haleakala || Pan-STARRS ||  || align=right data-sort-value="0.74" | 740 m || 
|-id=344 bgcolor=#d6d6d6
| 606344 ||  || — || October 19, 2012 || Haleakala || Pan-STARRS ||  || align=right | 2.5 km || 
|-id=345 bgcolor=#fefefe
| 606345 ||  || — || September 28, 2003 || Kitt Peak || Spacewatch ||  || align=right data-sort-value="0.77" | 770 m || 
|-id=346 bgcolor=#d6d6d6
| 606346 ||  || — || August 30, 2002 || Kitt Peak || Spacewatch ||  || align=right | 2.3 km || 
|-id=347 bgcolor=#fefefe
| 606347 ||  || — || March 30, 2016 || Haleakala || Pan-STARRS ||  || align=right data-sort-value="0.62" | 620 m || 
|-id=348 bgcolor=#fefefe
| 606348 ||  || — || August 10, 2013 || Kitt Peak || Spacewatch ||  || align=right data-sort-value="0.54" | 540 m || 
|-id=349 bgcolor=#d6d6d6
| 606349 ||  || — || December 6, 2008 || Kitt Peak || Spacewatch ||  || align=right | 1.5 km || 
|-id=350 bgcolor=#E9E9E9
| 606350 ||  || — || September 22, 2008 || Mount Lemmon || Mount Lemmon Survey ||  || align=right | 2.8 km || 
|-id=351 bgcolor=#d6d6d6
| 606351 ||  || — || February 14, 2009 || Mount Lemmon || Mount Lemmon Survey ||  || align=right | 2.8 km || 
|-id=352 bgcolor=#d6d6d6
| 606352 ||  || — || December 6, 2007 || Mount Lemmon || Mount Lemmon Survey ||  || align=right | 3.1 km || 
|-id=353 bgcolor=#E9E9E9
| 606353 ||  || — || October 22, 2017 || Mount Lemmon || Mount Lemmon Survey ||  || align=right | 1.1 km || 
|-id=354 bgcolor=#d6d6d6
| 606354 ||  || — || September 22, 2017 || Haleakala || Pan-STARRS ||  || align=right | 3.0 km || 
|-id=355 bgcolor=#fefefe
| 606355 ||  || — || August 17, 2006 || Palomar || NEAT ||  || align=right | 1.2 km || 
|-id=356 bgcolor=#E9E9E9
| 606356 ||  || — || November 11, 2013 || Kitt Peak || Spacewatch ||  || align=right data-sort-value="0.88" | 880 m || 
|-id=357 bgcolor=#C7FF8F
| 606357 ||  || — || March 13, 2005 || Mount Lemmon || Mount Lemmon Survey || unusual || align=right | 7.2 km || 
|-id=358 bgcolor=#fefefe
| 606358 ||  || — || August 28, 2009 || La Sagra || OAM Obs. || H || align=right data-sort-value="0.60" | 600 m || 
|-id=359 bgcolor=#fefefe
| 606359 ||  || — || January 13, 2005 || Socorro || LINEAR || H || align=right data-sort-value="0.74" | 740 m || 
|-id=360 bgcolor=#d6d6d6
| 606360 ||  || — || March 5, 2002 || Apache Point || SDSS Collaboration ||  || align=right | 2.5 km || 
|-id=361 bgcolor=#fefefe
| 606361 ||  || — || October 18, 2009 || Catalina || CSS || H || align=right data-sort-value="0.52" | 520 m || 
|-id=362 bgcolor=#E9E9E9
| 606362 ||  || — || October 28, 2017 || Haleakala || Pan-STARRS ||  || align=right data-sort-value="0.85" | 850 m || 
|-id=363 bgcolor=#E9E9E9
| 606363 ||  || — || October 28, 2017 || Haleakala || Pan-STARRS ||  || align=right | 1.1 km || 
|-id=364 bgcolor=#E9E9E9
| 606364 ||  || — || February 8, 2011 || Mount Lemmon || Mount Lemmon Survey ||  || align=right data-sort-value="0.86" | 860 m || 
|-id=365 bgcolor=#E9E9E9
| 606365 ||  || — || October 28, 2017 || Mount Lemmon || Mount Lemmon Survey ||  || align=right data-sort-value="0.98" | 980 m || 
|-id=366 bgcolor=#E9E9E9
| 606366 ||  || — || October 28, 2008 || Kitt Peak || Spacewatch ||  || align=right | 1.6 km || 
|-id=367 bgcolor=#FFC2E0
| 606367 ||  || — || November 2, 2017 || Haleakala || Pan-STARRS || APO +1km || align=right | 1.5 km || 
|-id=368 bgcolor=#FA8072
| 606368 ||  || — || June 2, 2014 || Mount Lemmon || Mount Lemmon Survey || H || align=right data-sort-value="0.61" | 610 m || 
|-id=369 bgcolor=#FA8072
| 606369 ||  || — || August 8, 2017 || Haleakala || Pan-STARRS ||  || align=right data-sort-value="0.80" | 800 m || 
|-id=370 bgcolor=#fefefe
| 606370 ||  || — || August 24, 2003 || Socorro || LINEAR ||  || align=right data-sort-value="0.91" | 910 m || 
|-id=371 bgcolor=#E9E9E9
| 606371 ||  || — || July 29, 2008 || Mount Lemmon || Mount Lemmon Survey ||  || align=right | 1.1 km || 
|-id=372 bgcolor=#d6d6d6
| 606372 ||  || — || February 1, 2009 || Kitt Peak || Spacewatch ||  || align=right | 2.3 km || 
|-id=373 bgcolor=#fefefe
| 606373 ||  || — || February 5, 2011 || Mount Lemmon || Mount Lemmon Survey ||  || align=right data-sort-value="0.68" | 680 m || 
|-id=374 bgcolor=#d6d6d6
| 606374 ||  || — || July 5, 2016 || Haleakala || Pan-STARRS ||  || align=right | 2.1 km || 
|-id=375 bgcolor=#d6d6d6
| 606375 ||  || — || December 15, 2007 || Mount Lemmon || Mount Lemmon Survey ||  || align=right | 2.2 km || 
|-id=376 bgcolor=#fefefe
| 606376 ||  || — || November 4, 2007 || Kitt Peak || Spacewatch ||  || align=right data-sort-value="0.47" | 470 m || 
|-id=377 bgcolor=#d6d6d6
| 606377 ||  || — || December 31, 2008 || Mount Lemmon || Mount Lemmon Survey ||  || align=right | 2.7 km || 
|-id=378 bgcolor=#d6d6d6
| 606378 ||  || — || September 4, 2011 || Kitt Peak || Spacewatch ||  || align=right | 2.5 km || 
|-id=379 bgcolor=#d6d6d6
| 606379 ||  || — || December 3, 2012 || Mount Lemmon || Mount Lemmon Survey ||  || align=right | 2.1 km || 
|-id=380 bgcolor=#d6d6d6
| 606380 ||  || — || October 2, 2006 || Kitt Peak || Spacewatch ||  || align=right | 2.2 km || 
|-id=381 bgcolor=#fefefe
| 606381 ||  || — || August 26, 2013 || Haleakala || Pan-STARRS ||  || align=right data-sort-value="0.64" | 640 m || 
|-id=382 bgcolor=#E9E9E9
| 606382 ||  || — || November 23, 2009 || Mount Lemmon || Mount Lemmon Survey ||  || align=right data-sort-value="0.73" | 730 m || 
|-id=383 bgcolor=#d6d6d6
| 606383 ||  || — || September 25, 2006 || Mount Lemmon || Mount Lemmon Survey ||  || align=right | 2.4 km || 
|-id=384 bgcolor=#E9E9E9
| 606384 ||  || — || November 26, 2005 || Mount Lemmon || Mount Lemmon Survey ||  || align=right data-sort-value="0.67" | 670 m || 
|-id=385 bgcolor=#d6d6d6
| 606385 ||  || — || October 20, 2006 || Kitt Peak || Spacewatch ||  || align=right | 1.9 km || 
|-id=386 bgcolor=#E9E9E9
| 606386 ||  || — || March 11, 2011 || Kitt Peak || Spacewatch ||  || align=right | 1.3 km || 
|-id=387 bgcolor=#d6d6d6
| 606387 ||  || — || October 15, 2001 || Kitt Peak || Spacewatch ||  || align=right | 3.2 km || 
|-id=388 bgcolor=#fefefe
| 606388 ||  || — || December 15, 2007 || Kitt Peak || Spacewatch ||  || align=right data-sort-value="0.64" | 640 m || 
|-id=389 bgcolor=#d6d6d6
| 606389 ||  || — || September 27, 2006 || Mount Lemmon || Mount Lemmon Survey ||  || align=right | 2.5 km || 
|-id=390 bgcolor=#fefefe
| 606390 ||  || — || September 18, 2009 || Mount Lemmon || Mount Lemmon Survey ||  || align=right data-sort-value="0.61" | 610 m || 
|-id=391 bgcolor=#FA8072
| 606391 ||  || — || November 11, 2007 || Mount Lemmon || Mount Lemmon Survey ||  || align=right | 1.6 km || 
|-id=392 bgcolor=#fefefe
| 606392 ||  || — || March 11, 2002 || Palomar || NEAT ||  || align=right data-sort-value="0.86" | 860 m || 
|-id=393 bgcolor=#fefefe
| 606393 ||  || — || December 5, 2010 || Mount Lemmon || Mount Lemmon Survey ||  || align=right data-sort-value="0.91" | 910 m || 
|-id=394 bgcolor=#E9E9E9
| 606394 ||  || — || November 16, 2017 || Mount Lemmon || Mount Lemmon Survey ||  || align=right | 1.2 km || 
|-id=395 bgcolor=#fefefe
| 606395 ||  || — || September 2, 2013 || Mount Lemmon || Mount Lemmon Survey ||  || align=right data-sort-value="0.82" | 820 m || 
|-id=396 bgcolor=#fefefe
| 606396 ||  || — || January 28, 2011 || Mount Lemmon || Mount Lemmon Survey ||  || align=right data-sort-value="0.78" | 780 m || 
|-id=397 bgcolor=#E9E9E9
| 606397 ||  || — || November 30, 2005 || Mount Lemmon || Mount Lemmon Survey ||  || align=right | 1.0 km || 
|-id=398 bgcolor=#E9E9E9
| 606398 ||  || — || May 23, 2011 || Nogales || M. Schwartz, P. R. Holvorcem ||  || align=right | 1.5 km || 
|-id=399 bgcolor=#fefefe
| 606399 ||  || — || September 30, 2003 || Kitt Peak || Spacewatch ||  || align=right data-sort-value="0.70" | 700 m || 
|-id=400 bgcolor=#E9E9E9
| 606400 ||  || — || January 17, 2013 || Haleakala || Pan-STARRS ||  || align=right | 2.3 km || 
|}

606401–606500 

|-bgcolor=#d6d6d6
| 606401 ||  || — || October 3, 2011 || XuYi || PMO NEO ||  || align=right | 2.8 km || 
|-id=402 bgcolor=#fefefe
| 606402 ||  || — || June 6, 2013 || Kitt Peak || Spacewatch ||  || align=right data-sort-value="0.68" | 680 m || 
|-id=403 bgcolor=#fefefe
| 606403 ||  || — || April 15, 2012 || Haleakala || Pan-STARRS ||  || align=right data-sort-value="0.89" | 890 m || 
|-id=404 bgcolor=#E9E9E9
| 606404 ||  || — || November 20, 2017 || Haleakala || Pan-STARRS ||  || align=right data-sort-value="0.94" | 940 m || 
|-id=405 bgcolor=#E9E9E9
| 606405 ||  || — || November 17, 2017 || Haleakala || Pan-STARRS ||  || align=right data-sort-value="0.66" | 660 m || 
|-id=406 bgcolor=#fefefe
| 606406 ||  || — || February 16, 2015 || Haleakala || Pan-STARRS ||  || align=right data-sort-value="0.64" | 640 m || 
|-id=407 bgcolor=#fefefe
| 606407 ||  || — || May 7, 2002 || Palomar || NEAT ||  || align=right data-sort-value="0.77" | 770 m || 
|-id=408 bgcolor=#fefefe
| 606408 ||  || — || October 30, 2007 || Mount Lemmon || Mount Lemmon Survey ||  || align=right data-sort-value="0.59" | 590 m || 
|-id=409 bgcolor=#fefefe
| 606409 ||  || — || November 27, 2010 || Mount Lemmon || Mount Lemmon Survey ||  || align=right data-sort-value="0.49" | 490 m || 
|-id=410 bgcolor=#d6d6d6
| 606410 ||  || — || February 8, 2002 || Kitt Peak || R. Millis, M. W. Buie ||  || align=right | 2.5 km || 
|-id=411 bgcolor=#d6d6d6
| 606411 ||  || — || February 24, 2014 || Haleakala || Pan-STARRS ||  || align=right | 2.2 km || 
|-id=412 bgcolor=#fefefe
| 606412 ||  || — || November 3, 2010 || Kitt Peak || Spacewatch ||  || align=right data-sort-value="0.54" | 540 m || 
|-id=413 bgcolor=#d6d6d6
| 606413 ||  || — || December 13, 2011 || Oukaimeden || C. Rinner ||  || align=right | 3.8 km || 
|-id=414 bgcolor=#E9E9E9
| 606414 ||  || — || September 6, 2004 || Palomar || NEAT ||  || align=right | 1.5 km || 
|-id=415 bgcolor=#fefefe
| 606415 ||  || — || October 13, 2010 || Mount Lemmon || Mount Lemmon Survey ||  || align=right data-sort-value="0.73" | 730 m || 
|-id=416 bgcolor=#fefefe
| 606416 ||  || — || September 30, 1999 || Kitt Peak || Spacewatch ||  || align=right data-sort-value="0.59" | 590 m || 
|-id=417 bgcolor=#E9E9E9
| 606417 ||  || — || October 4, 1996 || Kitt Peak || Spacewatch ||  || align=right | 1.0 km || 
|-id=418 bgcolor=#fefefe
| 606418 ||  || — || December 29, 2014 || Haleakala || Pan-STARRS ||  || align=right data-sort-value="0.46" | 460 m || 
|-id=419 bgcolor=#E9E9E9
| 606419 ||  || — || November 26, 2013 || Mount Lemmon || Mount Lemmon Survey ||  || align=right data-sort-value="0.87" | 870 m || 
|-id=420 bgcolor=#fefefe
| 606420 ||  || — || September 24, 2000 || Socorro || LINEAR ||  || align=right data-sort-value="0.68" | 680 m || 
|-id=421 bgcolor=#E9E9E9
| 606421 ||  || — || April 8, 2010 || Kitt Peak || Spacewatch ||  || align=right | 1.7 km || 
|-id=422 bgcolor=#fefefe
| 606422 ||  || — || October 27, 2017 || Mount Lemmon || Mount Lemmon Survey ||  || align=right data-sort-value="0.63" | 630 m || 
|-id=423 bgcolor=#fefefe
| 606423 ||  || — || July 31, 2000 || Cerro Tololo || M. W. Buie, S. D. Kern ||  || align=right data-sort-value="0.54" | 540 m || 
|-id=424 bgcolor=#fefefe
| 606424 ||  || — || April 25, 2008 || Mount Lemmon || Mount Lemmon Survey ||  || align=right data-sort-value="0.75" | 750 m || 
|-id=425 bgcolor=#fefefe
| 606425 ||  || — || June 8, 2016 || Haleakala || Pan-STARRS ||  || align=right data-sort-value="0.74" | 740 m || 
|-id=426 bgcolor=#fefefe
| 606426 ||  || — || March 1, 2008 || Kitt Peak || Spacewatch ||  || align=right data-sort-value="0.55" | 550 m || 
|-id=427 bgcolor=#fefefe
| 606427 ||  || — || July 28, 2005 || Palomar || NEAT ||  || align=right data-sort-value="0.76" | 760 m || 
|-id=428 bgcolor=#d6d6d6
| 606428 ||  || — || December 8, 2012 || Mount Lemmon || Mount Lemmon Survey ||  || align=right | 1.8 km || 
|-id=429 bgcolor=#E9E9E9
| 606429 ||  || — || November 27, 2013 || Haleakala || Pan-STARRS ||  || align=right data-sort-value="0.64" | 640 m || 
|-id=430 bgcolor=#fefefe
| 606430 ||  || — || February 18, 2004 || Kitt Peak || Spacewatch ||  || align=right data-sort-value="0.59" | 590 m || 
|-id=431 bgcolor=#d6d6d6
| 606431 ||  || — || January 23, 2006 || Mount Lemmon || Mount Lemmon Survey || 7:4 || align=right | 3.1 km || 
|-id=432 bgcolor=#fefefe
| 606432 ||  || — || November 20, 2006 || Kitt Peak || Spacewatch ||  || align=right data-sort-value="0.50" | 500 m || 
|-id=433 bgcolor=#E9E9E9
| 606433 ||  || — || November 26, 2013 || Mount Lemmon || Mount Lemmon Survey ||  || align=right data-sort-value="0.70" | 700 m || 
|-id=434 bgcolor=#E9E9E9
| 606434 ||  || — || January 25, 2006 || Kitt Peak || Spacewatch ||  || align=right | 1.3 km || 
|-id=435 bgcolor=#E9E9E9
| 606435 ||  || — || April 23, 2015 || Haleakala || Pan-STARRS ||  || align=right data-sort-value="0.64" | 640 m || 
|-id=436 bgcolor=#fefefe
| 606436 ||  || — || June 14, 2012 || Mount Lemmon || Mount Lemmon Survey ||  || align=right data-sort-value="0.86" | 860 m || 
|-id=437 bgcolor=#fefefe
| 606437 ||  || — || February 28, 2008 || Kitt Peak || Spacewatch ||  || align=right data-sort-value="0.56" | 560 m || 
|-id=438 bgcolor=#FFC2E0
| 606438 ||  || — || December 13, 2017 || Haleakala || Pan-STARRS || APO +1km || align=right data-sort-value="0.80" | 800 m || 
|-id=439 bgcolor=#E9E9E9
| 606439 ||  || — || March 4, 2006 || Mount Lemmon || Mount Lemmon Survey ||  || align=right data-sort-value="0.65" | 650 m || 
|-id=440 bgcolor=#d6d6d6
| 606440 ||  || — || March 25, 2007 || Catalina || CSS ||  || align=right | 4.3 km || 
|-id=441 bgcolor=#FFC2E0
| 606441 ||  || — || December 23, 2017 || Haleakala || Pan-STARRS || AMOPHA || align=right data-sort-value="0.54" | 540 m || 
|-id=442 bgcolor=#E9E9E9
| 606442 ||  || — || June 7, 2016 || Haleakala || Pan-STARRS ||  || align=right | 1.7 km || 
|-id=443 bgcolor=#fefefe
| 606443 ||  || — || July 27, 2011 || Haleakala || Pan-STARRS || H || align=right data-sort-value="0.58" | 580 m || 
|-id=444 bgcolor=#E9E9E9
| 606444 ||  || — || December 7, 2013 || Haleakala || Pan-STARRS ||  || align=right data-sort-value="0.83" | 830 m || 
|-id=445 bgcolor=#fefefe
| 606445 ||  || — || August 4, 2013 || Haleakala || Pan-STARRS ||  || align=right data-sort-value="0.80" | 800 m || 
|-id=446 bgcolor=#E9E9E9
| 606446 ||  || — || November 26, 2017 || Mount Lemmon || Mount Lemmon Survey ||  || align=right data-sort-value="0.96" | 960 m || 
|-id=447 bgcolor=#fefefe
| 606447 ||  || — || December 2, 2005 || Kitt Peak || Spacewatch ||  || align=right | 1.1 km || 
|-id=448 bgcolor=#E9E9E9
| 606448 ||  || — || October 7, 2012 || Haleakala || Pan-STARRS ||  || align=right data-sort-value="0.97" | 970 m || 
|-id=449 bgcolor=#E9E9E9
| 606449 ||  || — || November 23, 2003 || Kitt Peak || Spacewatch ||  || align=right | 2.0 km || 
|-id=450 bgcolor=#fefefe
| 606450 ||  || — || October 25, 2013 || Mount Lemmon || Mount Lemmon Survey ||  || align=right data-sort-value="0.70" | 700 m || 
|-id=451 bgcolor=#E9E9E9
| 606451 ||  || — || November 20, 2000 || Anderson Mesa || LONEOS ||  || align=right data-sort-value="0.98" | 980 m || 
|-id=452 bgcolor=#fefefe
| 606452 ||  || — || May 18, 2015 || Haleakala || Pan-STARRS ||  || align=right data-sort-value="0.91" | 910 m || 
|-id=453 bgcolor=#d6d6d6
| 606453 ||  || — || October 10, 2006 || Palomar || NEAT ||  || align=right | 2.5 km || 
|-id=454 bgcolor=#d6d6d6
| 606454 ||  || — || April 4, 2003 || Kitt Peak || Spacewatch ||  || align=right | 2.0 km || 
|-id=455 bgcolor=#E9E9E9
| 606455 ||  || — || December 23, 2017 || Haleakala || Pan-STARRS ||  || align=right | 1.2 km || 
|-id=456 bgcolor=#E9E9E9
| 606456 ||  || — || December 24, 2017 || Haleakala || Pan-STARRS ||  || align=right | 1.2 km || 
|-id=457 bgcolor=#E9E9E9
| 606457 ||  || — || December 25, 2017 || Haleakala || Pan-STARRS ||  || align=right | 2.0 km || 
|-id=458 bgcolor=#d6d6d6
| 606458 ||  || — || April 23, 2007 || Mount Lemmon || Mount Lemmon Survey ||  || align=right | 2.6 km || 
|-id=459 bgcolor=#d6d6d6
| 606459 ||  || — || June 30, 2014 || Kitt Peak || Spacewatch ||  || align=right | 2.2 km || 
|-id=460 bgcolor=#E9E9E9
| 606460 ||  || — || January 31, 2014 || Haleakala || Pan-STARRS ||  || align=right data-sort-value="0.90" | 900 m || 
|-id=461 bgcolor=#E9E9E9
| 606461 ||  || — || January 23, 2014 || Mount Lemmon || Mount Lemmon Survey ||  || align=right | 1.6 km || 
|-id=462 bgcolor=#fefefe
| 606462 ||  || — || November 17, 2010 || Mount Lemmon || Mount Lemmon Survey ||  || align=right | 1.0 km || 
|-id=463 bgcolor=#fefefe
| 606463 ||  || — || January 22, 2015 || Haleakala || Pan-STARRS ||  || align=right data-sort-value="0.74" | 740 m || 
|-id=464 bgcolor=#fefefe
| 606464 ||  || — || October 7, 2013 || Mount Lemmon || Mount Lemmon Survey ||  || align=right data-sort-value="0.67" | 670 m || 
|-id=465 bgcolor=#fefefe
| 606465 ||  || — || June 10, 2005 || Kitt Peak || Spacewatch ||  || align=right data-sort-value="0.67" | 670 m || 
|-id=466 bgcolor=#fefefe
| 606466 ||  || — || September 16, 2009 || Catalina || CSS ||  || align=right | 1.0 km || 
|-id=467 bgcolor=#fefefe
| 606467 ||  || — || February 8, 2011 || Mount Lemmon || Mount Lemmon Survey ||  || align=right data-sort-value="0.58" | 580 m || 
|-id=468 bgcolor=#fefefe
| 606468 ||  || — || March 11, 2008 || XuYi || PMO NEO ||  || align=right data-sort-value="0.89" | 890 m || 
|-id=469 bgcolor=#d6d6d6
| 606469 ||  || — || December 24, 2017 || Haleakala || Pan-STARRS ||  || align=right | 1.9 km || 
|-id=470 bgcolor=#fefefe
| 606470 ||  || — || February 22, 2001 || Kitt Peak || Spacewatch ||  || align=right data-sort-value="0.65" | 650 m || 
|-id=471 bgcolor=#d6d6d6
| 606471 ||  || — || October 13, 2005 || Kitt Peak || Spacewatch ||  || align=right | 2.6 km || 
|-id=472 bgcolor=#fefefe
| 606472 ||  || — || January 23, 2015 || Haleakala || Pan-STARRS ||  || align=right data-sort-value="0.57" | 570 m || 
|-id=473 bgcolor=#E9E9E9
| 606473 ||  || — || October 6, 2008 || Mount Lemmon || Mount Lemmon Survey ||  || align=right | 1.1 km || 
|-id=474 bgcolor=#d6d6d6
| 606474 ||  || — || August 27, 2016 || Haleakala || Pan-STARRS ||  || align=right | 1.6 km || 
|-id=475 bgcolor=#E9E9E9
| 606475 ||  || — || September 25, 2008 || Kitt Peak || Spacewatch ||  || align=right data-sort-value="0.94" | 940 m || 
|-id=476 bgcolor=#E9E9E9
| 606476 ||  || — || January 13, 2005 || Kitt Peak || Spacewatch ||  || align=right data-sort-value="0.89" | 890 m || 
|-id=477 bgcolor=#E9E9E9
| 606477 ||  || — || February 24, 2014 || Haleakala || Pan-STARRS ||  || align=right | 1.7 km || 
|-id=478 bgcolor=#d6d6d6
| 606478 ||  || — || January 27, 2007 || Mount Lemmon || Mount Lemmon Survey ||  || align=right | 2.3 km || 
|-id=479 bgcolor=#E9E9E9
| 606479 ||  || — || February 21, 2014 || Kitt Peak || Spacewatch ||  || align=right | 1.3 km || 
|-id=480 bgcolor=#d6d6d6
| 606480 ||  || — || January 14, 2018 || Haleakala || Pan-STARRS ||  || align=right | 1.7 km || 
|-id=481 bgcolor=#d6d6d6
| 606481 ||  || — || January 12, 2018 || Haleakala || Pan-STARRS ||  || align=right | 2.0 km || 
|-id=482 bgcolor=#E9E9E9
| 606482 ||  || — || January 14, 2018 || Haleakala || Pan-STARRS ||  || align=right | 1.5 km || 
|-id=483 bgcolor=#d6d6d6
| 606483 ||  || — || January 14, 2018 || Haleakala || Pan-STARRS ||  || align=right | 2.2 km || 
|-id=484 bgcolor=#d6d6d6
| 606484 ||  || — || January 14, 2018 || Haleakala || Pan-STARRS ||  || align=right | 2.2 km || 
|-id=485 bgcolor=#d6d6d6
| 606485 ||  || — || January 15, 2018 || Haleakala || Pan-STARRS ||  || align=right | 2.2 km || 
|-id=486 bgcolor=#d6d6d6
| 606486 ||  || — || January 15, 2018 || Haleakala || Pan-STARRS ||  || align=right | 1.6 km || 
|-id=487 bgcolor=#E9E9E9
| 606487 ||  || — || March 30, 2015 || Haleakala || Pan-STARRS ||  || align=right data-sort-value="0.86" | 860 m || 
|-id=488 bgcolor=#E9E9E9
| 606488 ||  || — || February 10, 2014 || Mount Lemmon || Mount Lemmon Survey ||  || align=right data-sort-value="0.94" | 940 m || 
|-id=489 bgcolor=#E9E9E9
| 606489 ||  || — || October 7, 2012 || Haleakala || Pan-STARRS ||  || align=right | 1.2 km || 
|-id=490 bgcolor=#d6d6d6
| 606490 ||  || — || October 25, 2012 || Mount Lemmon || Mount Lemmon Survey ||  || align=right | 3.4 km || 
|-id=491 bgcolor=#FA8072
| 606491 ||  || — || July 4, 2016 || Haleakala || Pan-STARRS ||  || align=right | 1.1 km || 
|-id=492 bgcolor=#FA8072
| 606492 ||  || — || March 6, 2013 || Haleakala || Pan-STARRS || H || align=right data-sort-value="0.55" | 550 m || 
|-id=493 bgcolor=#fefefe
| 606493 ||  || — || November 22, 2006 || Mount Lemmon || Mount Lemmon Survey ||  || align=right data-sort-value="0.88" | 880 m || 
|-id=494 bgcolor=#d6d6d6
| 606494 ||  || — || September 23, 2005 || Catalina || CSS ||  || align=right | 2.4 km || 
|-id=495 bgcolor=#E9E9E9
| 606495 ||  || — || January 28, 2014 || Catalina || CSS ||  || align=right | 1.1 km || 
|-id=496 bgcolor=#d6d6d6
| 606496 ||  || — || January 20, 2018 || Haleakala || Pan-STARRS ||  || align=right | 2.6 km || 
|-id=497 bgcolor=#E9E9E9
| 606497 ||  || — || January 16, 2018 || Haleakala || Pan-STARRS ||  || align=right | 1.5 km || 
|-id=498 bgcolor=#d6d6d6
| 606498 ||  || — || January 16, 2018 || Haleakala || Pan-STARRS ||  || align=right | 2.0 km || 
|-id=499 bgcolor=#d6d6d6
| 606499 ||  || — || January 23, 2018 || Mount Lemmon || Mount Lemmon Survey ||  || align=right | 2.1 km || 
|-id=500 bgcolor=#d6d6d6
| 606500 ||  || — || January 20, 2018 || Haleakala || Pan-STARRS ||  || align=right | 2.2 km || 
|}

606501–606600 

|-bgcolor=#d6d6d6
| 606501 ||  || — || January 16, 2018 || Calar Alto-CASADO || S. Mottola, S. Hellmich ||  || align=right | 2.4 km || 
|-id=502 bgcolor=#E9E9E9
| 606502 ||  || — || January 16, 2018 || Haleakala || Pan-STARRS ||  || align=right | 1.0 km || 
|-id=503 bgcolor=#d6d6d6
| 606503 ||  || — || January 16, 2018 || Haleakala || Pan-STARRS ||  || align=right | 1.9 km || 
|-id=504 bgcolor=#E9E9E9
| 606504 ||  || — || January 17, 2004 || Palomar || NEAT ||  || align=right | 2.4 km || 
|-id=505 bgcolor=#E9E9E9
| 606505 ||  || — || September 7, 2008 || Mount Lemmon || Mount Lemmon Survey ||  || align=right data-sort-value="0.75" | 750 m || 
|-id=506 bgcolor=#E9E9E9
| 606506 ||  || — || March 11, 2002 || Palomar || NEAT ||  || align=right | 1.3 km || 
|-id=507 bgcolor=#fefefe
| 606507 ||  || — || March 31, 2003 || Palomar || NEAT ||  || align=right | 1.5 km || 
|-id=508 bgcolor=#E9E9E9
| 606508 ||  || — || August 24, 2012 || Kitt Peak || Spacewatch ||  || align=right | 1.0 km || 
|-id=509 bgcolor=#E9E9E9
| 606509 ||  || — || August 7, 2016 || Haleakala || Pan-STARRS ||  || align=right | 1.4 km || 
|-id=510 bgcolor=#E9E9E9
| 606510 ||  || — || January 21, 1996 || Kitt Peak || Spacewatch ||  || align=right | 1.3 km || 
|-id=511 bgcolor=#E9E9E9
| 606511 ||  || — || January 3, 2001 || Socorro || LINEAR ||  || align=right | 1.5 km || 
|-id=512 bgcolor=#E9E9E9
| 606512 ||  || — || April 10, 2010 || Kitt Peak || Spacewatch ||  || align=right | 2.0 km || 
|-id=513 bgcolor=#E9E9E9
| 606513 ||  || — || August 26, 2012 || Catalina || CSS ||  || align=right | 1.1 km || 
|-id=514 bgcolor=#E9E9E9
| 606514 ||  || — || February 4, 2009 || Mount Lemmon || Mount Lemmon Survey ||  || align=right | 2.6 km || 
|-id=515 bgcolor=#d6d6d6
| 606515 ||  || — || February 17, 2002 || Palomar || NEAT ||  || align=right | 2.9 km || 
|-id=516 bgcolor=#E9E9E9
| 606516 ||  || — || June 22, 2007 || Kitt Peak || Spacewatch ||  || align=right | 1.4 km || 
|-id=517 bgcolor=#E9E9E9
| 606517 ||  || — || October 27, 2008 || Mount Lemmon || Mount Lemmon Survey ||  || align=right | 1.2 km || 
|-id=518 bgcolor=#E9E9E9
| 606518 ||  || — || December 2, 2008 || Kitt Peak || Spacewatch ||  || align=right | 2.6 km || 
|-id=519 bgcolor=#fefefe
| 606519 ||  || — || March 10, 2007 || Kitt Peak || Spacewatch ||  || align=right data-sort-value="0.76" | 760 m || 
|-id=520 bgcolor=#E9E9E9
| 606520 ||  || — || February 4, 2009 || Mount Lemmon || Mount Lemmon Survey ||  || align=right | 2.2 km || 
|-id=521 bgcolor=#E9E9E9
| 606521 ||  || — || January 15, 2005 || Anderson Mesa || LONEOS ||  || align=right | 1.7 km || 
|-id=522 bgcolor=#d6d6d6
| 606522 ||  || — || April 13, 2013 || Kitt Peak || Spacewatch ||  || align=right | 2.8 km || 
|-id=523 bgcolor=#E9E9E9
| 606523 ||  || — || March 8, 2005 || Catalina || CSS ||  || align=right | 2.0 km || 
|-id=524 bgcolor=#E9E9E9
| 606524 ||  || — || November 2, 2008 || Catalina || CSS ||  || align=right | 1.4 km || 
|-id=525 bgcolor=#d6d6d6
| 606525 ||  || — || February 19, 2007 || Catalina || CSS || Tj (2.98) || align=right | 3.1 km || 
|-id=526 bgcolor=#fefefe
| 606526 ||  || — || February 13, 2011 || Mount Lemmon || Mount Lemmon Survey ||  || align=right data-sort-value="0.64" | 640 m || 
|-id=527 bgcolor=#E9E9E9
| 606527 ||  || — || November 4, 2004 || Kitt Peak || Spacewatch ||  || align=right | 1.0 km || 
|-id=528 bgcolor=#fefefe
| 606528 ||  || — || November 3, 2005 || Catalina || CSS ||  || align=right data-sort-value="0.85" | 850 m || 
|-id=529 bgcolor=#E9E9E9
| 606529 ||  || — || April 7, 2005 || Kitt Peak || Spacewatch ||  || align=right | 2.5 km || 
|-id=530 bgcolor=#fefefe
| 606530 ||  || — || April 1, 2015 || Haleakala || Pan-STARRS ||  || align=right | 1.2 km || 
|-id=531 bgcolor=#d6d6d6
| 606531 ||  || — || March 21, 2009 || Kitt Peak || Spacewatch ||  || align=right | 2.3 km || 
|-id=532 bgcolor=#E9E9E9
| 606532 ||  || — || September 27, 2008 || Mount Lemmon || Mount Lemmon Survey ||  || align=right data-sort-value="0.64" | 640 m || 
|-id=533 bgcolor=#E9E9E9
| 606533 ||  || — || April 5, 2005 || Mount Lemmon || Mount Lemmon Survey ||  || align=right | 1.9 km || 
|-id=534 bgcolor=#fefefe
| 606534 ||  || — || February 6, 2007 || Palomar || NEAT ||  || align=right data-sort-value="0.82" | 820 m || 
|-id=535 bgcolor=#E9E9E9
| 606535 ||  || — || March 18, 2001 || Haleakala || AMOS ||  || align=right | 1.9 km || 
|-id=536 bgcolor=#E9E9E9
| 606536 ||  || — || December 28, 2000 || Kitt Peak || Spacewatch ||  || align=right | 1.6 km || 
|-id=537 bgcolor=#fefefe
| 606537 ||  || — || September 17, 2006 || Catalina || CSS || H || align=right data-sort-value="0.66" | 660 m || 
|-id=538 bgcolor=#d6d6d6
| 606538 ||  || — || February 12, 2018 || Haleakala || Pan-STARRS ||  || align=right | 2.0 km || 
|-id=539 bgcolor=#d6d6d6
| 606539 ||  || — || February 12, 2018 || Haleakala || Pan-STARRS ||  || align=right | 2.3 km || 
|-id=540 bgcolor=#E9E9E9
| 606540 ||  || — || September 19, 2011 || Haleakala || Pan-STARRS ||  || align=right | 1.9 km || 
|-id=541 bgcolor=#d6d6d6
| 606541 ||  || — || January 27, 2007 || Kitt Peak || Spacewatch ||  || align=right | 2.1 km || 
|-id=542 bgcolor=#fefefe
| 606542 ||  || — || December 16, 2004 || Catalina || CSS || H || align=right data-sort-value="0.69" | 690 m || 
|-id=543 bgcolor=#d6d6d6
| 606543 ||  || — || January 25, 2007 || Kitt Peak || Spacewatch ||  || align=right | 2.3 km || 
|-id=544 bgcolor=#d6d6d6
| 606544 ||  || — || March 16, 2013 || Kitt Peak || Spacewatch ||  || align=right | 2.0 km || 
|-id=545 bgcolor=#fefefe
| 606545 ||  || — || March 27, 2011 || Mount Lemmon || Mount Lemmon Survey ||  || align=right data-sort-value="0.71" | 710 m || 
|-id=546 bgcolor=#E9E9E9
| 606546 ||  || — || December 21, 2012 || Mount Lemmon || Mount Lemmon Survey ||  || align=right | 1.4 km || 
|-id=547 bgcolor=#d6d6d6
| 606547 ||  || — || March 15, 2013 || Mount Lemmon || Mount Lemmon Survey ||  || align=right | 2.4 km || 
|-id=548 bgcolor=#d6d6d6
| 606548 ||  || — || June 30, 2014 || Haleakala || Pan-STARRS || Tj (2.94) || align=right | 3.4 km || 
|-id=549 bgcolor=#fefefe
| 606549 ||  || — || May 5, 2003 || Kitt Peak || Spacewatch ||  || align=right data-sort-value="0.94" | 940 m || 
|-id=550 bgcolor=#E9E9E9
| 606550 ||  || — || February 15, 2010 || Catalina || CSS ||  || align=right | 1.3 km || 
|-id=551 bgcolor=#fefefe
| 606551 ||  || — || February 19, 2007 || Catalina || CSS ||  || align=right data-sort-value="0.82" | 820 m || 
|-id=552 bgcolor=#fefefe
| 606552 ||  || — || April 11, 2013 || Siding Spring || SSS || H || align=right data-sort-value="0.70" | 700 m || 
|-id=553 bgcolor=#E9E9E9
| 606553 ||  || — || October 16, 2012 || Mount Lemmon || Mount Lemmon Survey ||  || align=right | 1.3 km || 
|-id=554 bgcolor=#E9E9E9
| 606554 ||  || — || January 10, 2013 || Haleakala || Pan-STARRS ||  || align=right | 2.7 km || 
|-id=555 bgcolor=#E9E9E9
| 606555 ||  || — || February 21, 2009 || Kitt Peak || Spacewatch ||  || align=right | 1.4 km || 
|-id=556 bgcolor=#d6d6d6
| 606556 ||  || — || March 11, 2007 || Kitt Peak || Spacewatch ||  || align=right | 2.3 km || 
|-id=557 bgcolor=#fefefe
| 606557 ||  || — || April 14, 2007 || Kitt Peak || Spacewatch ||  || align=right data-sort-value="0.72" | 720 m || 
|-id=558 bgcolor=#fefefe
| 606558 ||  || — || October 18, 1998 || Kitt Peak || Spacewatch ||  || align=right data-sort-value="0.64" | 640 m || 
|-id=559 bgcolor=#fefefe
| 606559 ||  || — || February 10, 2008 || Mount Lemmon || Mount Lemmon Survey ||  || align=right data-sort-value="0.55" | 550 m || 
|-id=560 bgcolor=#fefefe
| 606560 ||  || — || October 15, 2012 || Mount Lemmon || Mount Lemmon Survey ||  || align=right data-sort-value="0.74" | 740 m || 
|-id=561 bgcolor=#d6d6d6
| 606561 ||  || — || February 21, 2007 || Kitt Peak || Spacewatch ||  || align=right | 2.5 km || 
|-id=562 bgcolor=#fefefe
| 606562 ||  || — || August 27, 2006 || Kitt Peak || Spacewatch ||  || align=right data-sort-value="0.57" | 570 m || 
|-id=563 bgcolor=#E9E9E9
| 606563 ||  || — || October 22, 2011 || Mount Lemmon || Mount Lemmon Survey ||  || align=right | 1.2 km || 
|-id=564 bgcolor=#d6d6d6
| 606564 ||  || — || December 23, 2016 || Haleakala || Pan-STARRS ||  || align=right | 2.4 km || 
|-id=565 bgcolor=#fefefe
| 606565 ||  || — || April 27, 2008 || Kitt Peak || Spacewatch ||  || align=right data-sort-value="0.60" | 600 m || 
|-id=566 bgcolor=#fefefe
| 606566 ||  || — || May 5, 2008 || Mount Lemmon || Mount Lemmon Survey ||  || align=right data-sort-value="0.62" | 620 m || 
|-id=567 bgcolor=#fefefe
| 606567 ||  || — || January 10, 2007 || Kitt Peak || Spacewatch ||  || align=right data-sort-value="0.54" | 540 m || 
|-id=568 bgcolor=#E9E9E9
| 606568 ||  || — || January 2, 2013 || Mount Lemmon || Mount Lemmon Survey ||  || align=right | 1.4 km || 
|-id=569 bgcolor=#fefefe
| 606569 ||  || — || November 10, 2009 || Kitt Peak || Spacewatch ||  || align=right data-sort-value="0.70" | 700 m || 
|-id=570 bgcolor=#E9E9E9
| 606570 ||  || — || February 20, 2009 || Mount Lemmon || Mount Lemmon Survey ||  || align=right | 1.4 km || 
|-id=571 bgcolor=#d6d6d6
| 606571 ||  || — || February 1, 2012 || Kitt Peak || Spacewatch ||  || align=right | 2.3 km || 
|-id=572 bgcolor=#fefefe
| 606572 ||  || — || February 10, 2014 || Haleakala || Pan-STARRS ||  || align=right data-sort-value="0.72" | 720 m || 
|-id=573 bgcolor=#d6d6d6
| 606573 ||  || — || March 17, 2018 || Haleakala || Pan-STARRS || 3:2 || align=right | 3.0 km || 
|-id=574 bgcolor=#fefefe
| 606574 ||  || — || February 21, 2007 || Kitt Peak || Spacewatch ||  || align=right data-sort-value="0.56" | 560 m || 
|-id=575 bgcolor=#E9E9E9
| 606575 ||  || — || February 28, 2009 || Kitt Peak || Spacewatch ||  || align=right | 1.6 km || 
|-id=576 bgcolor=#E9E9E9
| 606576 ||  || — || September 9, 2007 || Mount Lemmon || Mount Lemmon Survey ||  || align=right data-sort-value="0.99" | 990 m || 
|-id=577 bgcolor=#fefefe
| 606577 ||  || — || March 16, 2005 || Mount Lemmon || Mount Lemmon Survey ||  || align=right data-sort-value="0.54" | 540 m || 
|-id=578 bgcolor=#E9E9E9
| 606578 ||  || — || September 13, 2007 || Mount Lemmon || Mount Lemmon Survey ||  || align=right | 1.2 km || 
|-id=579 bgcolor=#fefefe
| 606579 ||  || — || February 9, 2014 || Kitt Peak || Spacewatch ||  || align=right data-sort-value="0.77" | 770 m || 
|-id=580 bgcolor=#E9E9E9
| 606580 ||  || — || April 10, 2010 || Mount Lemmon || Mount Lemmon Survey ||  || align=right | 1.1 km || 
|-id=581 bgcolor=#d6d6d6
| 606581 ||  || — || March 18, 2018 || Haleakala || Pan-STARRS ||  || align=right | 1.9 km || 
|-id=582 bgcolor=#d6d6d6
| 606582 ||  || — || April 23, 2013 || Mount Lemmon || Mount Lemmon Survey ||  || align=right | 2.5 km || 
|-id=583 bgcolor=#d6d6d6
| 606583 ||  || — || January 29, 2012 || Catalina || CSS ||  || align=right | 3.9 km || 
|-id=584 bgcolor=#d6d6d6
| 606584 ||  || — || April 23, 2007 || Mount Lemmon || Mount Lemmon Survey ||  || align=right | 1.9 km || 
|-id=585 bgcolor=#d6d6d6
| 606585 ||  || — || June 4, 2002 || Palomar || NEAT ||  || align=right | 2.9 km || 
|-id=586 bgcolor=#d6d6d6
| 606586 ||  || — || May 9, 2007 || Kitt Peak || Spacewatch ||  || align=right | 4.4 km || 
|-id=587 bgcolor=#E9E9E9
| 606587 ||  || — || October 18, 2007 || Kitt Peak || Spacewatch ||  || align=right | 1.7 km || 
|-id=588 bgcolor=#d6d6d6
| 606588 ||  || — || October 28, 2005 || Kitt Peak || Spacewatch ||  || align=right | 2.1 km || 
|-id=589 bgcolor=#E9E9E9
| 606589 ||  || — || April 1, 2014 || Mount Lemmon || Mount Lemmon Survey ||  || align=right | 1.1 km || 
|-id=590 bgcolor=#fefefe
| 606590 ||  || — || January 24, 2014 || Haleakala || Pan-STARRS ||  || align=right data-sort-value="0.66" | 660 m || 
|-id=591 bgcolor=#d6d6d6
| 606591 ||  || — || April 15, 2007 || Kitt Peak || Spacewatch ||  || align=right | 3.2 km || 
|-id=592 bgcolor=#fefefe
| 606592 ||  || — || September 16, 2004 || Kitt Peak || Spacewatch ||  || align=right data-sort-value="0.77" | 770 m || 
|-id=593 bgcolor=#fefefe
| 606593 ||  || — || May 4, 2005 || Mount Lemmon || Mount Lemmon Survey ||  || align=right data-sort-value="0.67" | 670 m || 
|-id=594 bgcolor=#E9E9E9
| 606594 ||  || — || July 19, 2015 || Haleakala || Pan-STARRS ||  || align=right | 1.2 km || 
|-id=595 bgcolor=#fefefe
| 606595 ||  || — || June 25, 2015 || Haleakala || Pan-STARRS ||  || align=right data-sort-value="0.60" | 600 m || 
|-id=596 bgcolor=#E9E9E9
| 606596 ||  || — || September 12, 2007 || Mount Lemmon || Mount Lemmon Survey ||  || align=right | 1.3 km || 
|-id=597 bgcolor=#d6d6d6
| 606597 ||  || — || April 10, 2013 || Haleakala || Pan-STARRS ||  || align=right | 1.9 km || 
|-id=598 bgcolor=#E9E9E9
| 606598 ||  || — || July 28, 2011 || Haleakala || Pan-STARRS ||  || align=right data-sort-value="0.80" | 800 m || 
|-id=599 bgcolor=#fefefe
| 606599 ||  || — || January 16, 2017 || Haleakala || Pan-STARRS ||  || align=right data-sort-value="0.61" | 610 m || 
|-id=600 bgcolor=#fefefe
| 606600 ||  || — || April 14, 2005 || Catalina || CSS || H || align=right data-sort-value="0.73" | 730 m || 
|}

606601–606700 

|-bgcolor=#fefefe
| 606601 ||  || — || February 12, 2015 || Haleakala || Pan-STARRS || H || align=right data-sort-value="0.69" | 690 m || 
|-id=602 bgcolor=#E9E9E9
| 606602 ||  || — || April 15, 2010 || Mount Lemmon || Mount Lemmon Survey ||  || align=right | 1.4 km || 
|-id=603 bgcolor=#d6d6d6
| 606603 ||  || — || March 30, 2012 || Kitt Peak || Spacewatch ||  || align=right | 2.7 km || 
|-id=604 bgcolor=#FA8072
| 606604 ||  || — || March 15, 2010 || Catalina || CSS ||  || align=right data-sort-value="0.69" | 690 m || 
|-id=605 bgcolor=#FFC2E0
| 606605 ||  || — || April 13, 2018 || Haleakala || Pan-STARRS || APO +1km || align=right | 1.2 km || 
|-id=606 bgcolor=#d6d6d6
| 606606 ||  || — || September 18, 2014 || Haleakala || Pan-STARRS ||  || align=right | 3.6 km || 
|-id=607 bgcolor=#E9E9E9
| 606607 ||  || — || April 20, 2009 || Catalina || CSS ||  || align=right | 1.7 km || 
|-id=608 bgcolor=#FA8072
| 606608 ||  || — || June 1, 2013 || Haleakala || Pan-STARRS ||  || align=right | 3.3 km || 
|-id=609 bgcolor=#d6d6d6
| 606609 ||  || — || June 10, 2007 || Kitt Peak || Spacewatch ||  || align=right | 2.6 km || 
|-id=610 bgcolor=#E9E9E9
| 606610 ||  || — || March 13, 2013 || Catalina || CSS ||  || align=right | 1.7 km || 
|-id=611 bgcolor=#fefefe
| 606611 ||  || — || September 14, 1996 || Kitt Peak || Spacewatch ||  || align=right data-sort-value="0.82" | 820 m || 
|-id=612 bgcolor=#E9E9E9
| 606612 ||  || — || June 20, 2010 || ESA OGS || ESA OGS ||  || align=right | 1.6 km || 
|-id=613 bgcolor=#fefefe
| 606613 ||  || — || April 6, 2014 || Mount Lemmon || Mount Lemmon Survey ||  || align=right data-sort-value="0.88" | 880 m || 
|-id=614 bgcolor=#d6d6d6
| 606614 ||  || — || March 4, 2006 || Kitt Peak || Spacewatch ||  || align=right | 2.6 km || 
|-id=615 bgcolor=#d6d6d6
| 606615 ||  || — || September 25, 2014 || Mount Lemmon || Mount Lemmon Survey ||  || align=right | 2.6 km || 
|-id=616 bgcolor=#E9E9E9
| 606616 ||  || — || April 10, 2013 || Haleakala || Pan-STARRS ||  || align=right | 1.9 km || 
|-id=617 bgcolor=#d6d6d6
| 606617 ||  || — || August 27, 2014 || Haleakala || Pan-STARRS ||  || align=right | 2.2 km || 
|-id=618 bgcolor=#d6d6d6
| 606618 ||  || — || January 28, 2007 || Mount Lemmon || Mount Lemmon Survey ||  || align=right | 2.8 km || 
|-id=619 bgcolor=#E9E9E9
| 606619 ||  || — || August 13, 2004 || Cerro Tololo || Cerro Tololo Obs. ||  || align=right | 1.9 km || 
|-id=620 bgcolor=#d6d6d6
| 606620 ||  || — || October 1, 2014 || Haleakala || Pan-STARRS ||  || align=right | 2.4 km || 
|-id=621 bgcolor=#C2FFFF
| 606621 ||  || — || September 20, 2009 || Mount Lemmon || Mount Lemmon Survey || L4 || align=right | 6.0 km || 
|-id=622 bgcolor=#E9E9E9
| 606622 ||  || — || June 15, 2018 || Haleakala || Pan-STARRS ||  || align=right data-sort-value="0.75" | 750 m || 
|-id=623 bgcolor=#E9E9E9
| 606623 ||  || — || September 20, 2014 || Haleakala || Pan-STARRS ||  || align=right | 2.0 km || 
|-id=624 bgcolor=#d6d6d6
| 606624 ||  || — || February 25, 2007 || Kitt Peak || Spacewatch ||  || align=right | 1.8 km || 
|-id=625 bgcolor=#E9E9E9
| 606625 ||  || — || April 8, 2008 || Mount Lemmon || Mount Lemmon Survey ||  || align=right | 1.9 km || 
|-id=626 bgcolor=#FA8072
| 606626 ||  || — || May 8, 2014 || Haleakala || Pan-STARRS ||  || align=right | 1.3 km || 
|-id=627 bgcolor=#d6d6d6
| 606627 ||  || — || September 15, 2007 || Catalina || CSS ||  || align=right | 4.4 km || 
|-id=628 bgcolor=#E9E9E9
| 606628 ||  || — || December 26, 2006 || Kitt Peak || Spacewatch ||  || align=right | 2.0 km || 
|-id=629 bgcolor=#d6d6d6
| 606629 ||  || — || November 17, 2014 || Haleakala || Pan-STARRS ||  || align=right | 2.8 km || 
|-id=630 bgcolor=#C2FFFF
| 606630 ||  || — || June 16, 2018 || Haleakala || Pan-STARRS || L4 || align=right | 6.4 km || 
|-id=631 bgcolor=#E9E9E9
| 606631 ||  || — || June 18, 2014 || Haleakala || Pan-STARRS ||  || align=right | 1.6 km || 
|-id=632 bgcolor=#FA8072
| 606632 ||  || — || October 22, 2013 || Mount Lemmon || Mount Lemmon Survey || H || align=right data-sort-value="0.88" | 880 m || 
|-id=633 bgcolor=#d6d6d6
| 606633 ||  || — || April 19, 2013 || Haleakala || Pan-STARRS ||  || align=right | 1.5 km || 
|-id=634 bgcolor=#d6d6d6
| 606634 ||  || — || November 11, 2004 || Kitt Peak || Kitt Peak Obs. || Tj (2.99) || align=right | 3.3 km || 
|-id=635 bgcolor=#d6d6d6
| 606635 ||  || — || September 26, 2008 || Kitt Peak || Spacewatch ||  || align=right | 2.2 km || 
|-id=636 bgcolor=#fefefe
| 606636 ||  || — || May 6, 2008 || Mount Lemmon || Mount Lemmon Survey ||  || align=right data-sort-value="0.56" | 560 m || 
|-id=637 bgcolor=#d6d6d6
| 606637 ||  || — || April 27, 2012 || Haleakala || Pan-STARRS ||  || align=right | 2.5 km || 
|-id=638 bgcolor=#d6d6d6
| 606638 ||  || — || November 18, 2008 || Kitt Peak || Spacewatch ||  || align=right | 3.1 km || 
|-id=639 bgcolor=#E9E9E9
| 606639 ||  || — || January 15, 2008 || Mount Lemmon || Mount Lemmon Survey ||  || align=right | 1.5 km || 
|-id=640 bgcolor=#fefefe
| 606640 ||  || — || May 8, 2014 || Haleakala || Pan-STARRS ||  || align=right data-sort-value="0.50" | 500 m || 
|-id=641 bgcolor=#d6d6d6
| 606641 ||  || — || July 12, 2018 || Haleakala || Pan-STARRS 2 ||  || align=right | 2.6 km || 
|-id=642 bgcolor=#C2FFFF
| 606642 ||  || — || July 10, 2018 || Haleakala || Pan-STARRS || L4 || align=right | 6.1 km || 
|-id=643 bgcolor=#d6d6d6
| 606643 ||  || — || September 11, 2007 || Mount Lemmon || Mount Lemmon Survey ||  || align=right | 3.2 km || 
|-id=644 bgcolor=#d6d6d6
| 606644 ||  || — || October 3, 2013 || Catalina || CSS ||  || align=right | 2.3 km || 
|-id=645 bgcolor=#d6d6d6
| 606645 ||  || — || September 14, 2013 || Haleakala || Pan-STARRS ||  || align=right | 2.8 km || 
|-id=646 bgcolor=#d6d6d6
| 606646 ||  || — || December 29, 2014 || Haleakala || Pan-STARRS ||  || align=right | 2.4 km || 
|-id=647 bgcolor=#E9E9E9
| 606647 ||  || — || November 16, 2010 || Mount Lemmon || Mount Lemmon Survey ||  || align=right | 2.1 km || 
|-id=648 bgcolor=#E9E9E9
| 606648 ||  || — || January 2, 2017 || Haleakala || Pan-STARRS ||  || align=right | 1.6 km || 
|-id=649 bgcolor=#d6d6d6
| 606649 ||  || — || December 13, 2013 || Mount Lemmon || Mount Lemmon Survey ||  || align=right | 3.0 km || 
|-id=650 bgcolor=#d6d6d6
| 606650 ||  || — || December 29, 2014 || Mount Lemmon || Mount Lemmon Survey ||  || align=right | 2.4 km || 
|-id=651 bgcolor=#fefefe
| 606651 ||  || — || December 23, 2012 || Haleakala || Pan-STARRS ||  || align=right data-sort-value="0.52" | 520 m || 
|-id=652 bgcolor=#d6d6d6
| 606652 ||  || — || January 20, 2015 || Mount Lemmon || Mount Lemmon Survey ||  || align=right | 2.8 km || 
|-id=653 bgcolor=#C7FF8F
| 606653 ||  || — || August 18, 2018 || Haleakala || Pan-STARRS || centaur || align=right | 18 km || 
|-id=654 bgcolor=#E9E9E9
| 606654 ||  || — || October 31, 2010 || Kitt Peak || Spacewatch ||  || align=right data-sort-value="0.59" | 590 m || 
|-id=655 bgcolor=#d6d6d6
| 606655 ||  || — || January 2, 2009 || Kitt Peak || Spacewatch ||  || align=right | 2.6 km || 
|-id=656 bgcolor=#d6d6d6
| 606656 ||  || — || October 9, 2007 || Kitt Peak || Spacewatch ||  || align=right | 3.3 km || 
|-id=657 bgcolor=#d6d6d6
| 606657 ||  || — || November 19, 2007 || Mount Lemmon || Mount Lemmon Survey ||  || align=right | 3.0 km || 
|-id=658 bgcolor=#d6d6d6
| 606658 ||  || — || November 1, 2013 || Mount Lemmon || Mount Lemmon Survey ||  || align=right | 2.9 km || 
|-id=659 bgcolor=#fefefe
| 606659 ||  || — || October 24, 2015 || Haleakala || Pan-STARRS ||  || align=right data-sort-value="0.55" | 550 m || 
|-id=660 bgcolor=#fefefe
| 606660 ||  || — || November 30, 2011 || Mount Lemmon || Mount Lemmon Survey ||  || align=right data-sort-value="0.81" | 810 m || 
|-id=661 bgcolor=#d6d6d6
| 606661 ||  || — || October 8, 2007 || Mount Lemmon || Mount Lemmon Survey ||  || align=right | 2.0 km || 
|-id=662 bgcolor=#d6d6d6
| 606662 ||  || — || September 6, 2013 || Mount Lemmon || Mount Lemmon Survey ||  || align=right | 2.4 km || 
|-id=663 bgcolor=#E9E9E9
| 606663 ||  || — || October 19, 2010 || Mount Lemmon || Mount Lemmon Survey ||  || align=right data-sort-value="0.60" | 600 m || 
|-id=664 bgcolor=#E9E9E9
| 606664 ||  || — || October 31, 2005 || Kitt Peak || Spacewatch ||  || align=right | 1.6 km || 
|-id=665 bgcolor=#d6d6d6
| 606665 ||  || — || September 10, 2007 || Kitt Peak || Spacewatch ||  || align=right | 2.8 km || 
|-id=666 bgcolor=#E9E9E9
| 606666 ||  || — || October 10, 2010 || Mount Lemmon || Mount Lemmon Survey ||  || align=right | 1.2 km || 
|-id=667 bgcolor=#fefefe
| 606667 ||  || — || November 19, 2008 || Mount Lemmon || Mount Lemmon Survey ||  || align=right data-sort-value="0.82" | 820 m || 
|-id=668 bgcolor=#FA8072
| 606668 ||  || — || July 3, 2008 || Siding Spring || SSS ||  || align=right data-sort-value="0.62" | 620 m || 
|-id=669 bgcolor=#d6d6d6
| 606669 ||  || — || August 21, 2012 || Haleakala || Pan-STARRS || Tj (2.99) || align=right | 2.9 km || 
|-id=670 bgcolor=#fefefe
| 606670 ||  || — || February 8, 2013 || Haleakala || Pan-STARRS ||  || align=right data-sort-value="0.87" | 870 m || 
|-id=671 bgcolor=#fefefe
| 606671 ||  || — || September 20, 2011 || Haleakala || Pan-STARRS ||  || align=right data-sort-value="0.95" | 950 m || 
|-id=672 bgcolor=#fefefe
| 606672 ||  || — || September 10, 2004 || Socorro || LINEAR ||  || align=right data-sort-value="0.55" | 550 m || 
|-id=673 bgcolor=#E9E9E9
| 606673 ||  || — || July 12, 2013 || Haleakala || Pan-STARRS ||  || align=right | 1.7 km || 
|-id=674 bgcolor=#E9E9E9
| 606674 ||  || — || March 5, 2016 || Haleakala || Pan-STARRS ||  || align=right | 1.6 km || 
|-id=675 bgcolor=#d6d6d6
| 606675 ||  || — || October 10, 2007 || Mount Lemmon || Mount Lemmon Survey ||  || align=right | 3.1 km || 
|-id=676 bgcolor=#d6d6d6
| 606676 ||  || — || August 19, 2003 || Campo Imperatore || CINEOS ||  || align=right | 2.0 km || 
|-id=677 bgcolor=#d6d6d6
| 606677 ||  || — || December 24, 2014 || Mount Lemmon || Mount Lemmon Survey ||  || align=right | 3.3 km || 
|-id=678 bgcolor=#d6d6d6
| 606678 ||  || — || October 8, 2007 || Catalina || CSS ||  || align=right | 3.2 km || 
|-id=679 bgcolor=#d6d6d6
| 606679 ||  || — || October 1, 2005 || Anderson Mesa || LONEOS || 7:4 || align=right | 4.8 km || 
|-id=680 bgcolor=#E9E9E9
| 606680 ||  || — || October 29, 2005 || Catalina || CSS ||  || align=right | 1.6 km || 
|-id=681 bgcolor=#E9E9E9
| 606681 ||  || — || November 5, 2010 || Mount Lemmon || Mount Lemmon Survey ||  || align=right | 1.2 km || 
|-id=682 bgcolor=#E9E9E9
| 606682 ||  || — || April 17, 2013 || Haleakala || Pan-STARRS ||  || align=right | 1.2 km || 
|-id=683 bgcolor=#E9E9E9
| 606683 ||  || — || September 27, 2009 || Mount Lemmon || Mount Lemmon Survey ||  || align=right | 2.0 km || 
|-id=684 bgcolor=#fefefe
| 606684 ||  || — || March 16, 2010 || Mount Lemmon || Mount Lemmon Survey ||  || align=right data-sort-value="0.88" | 880 m || 
|-id=685 bgcolor=#E9E9E9
| 606685 ||  || — || September 29, 2005 || Catalina || CSS ||  || align=right | 1.3 km || 
|-id=686 bgcolor=#fefefe
| 606686 ||  || — || September 8, 2018 || Mount Lemmon || Mount Lemmon Survey || H || align=right data-sort-value="0.53" | 530 m || 
|-id=687 bgcolor=#fefefe
| 606687 ||  || — || October 26, 2013 || Kitt Peak || Spacewatch || H || align=right data-sort-value="0.54" | 540 m || 
|-id=688 bgcolor=#d6d6d6
| 606688 ||  || — || August 22, 2007 || Anderson Mesa || LONEOS ||  || align=right | 2.5 km || 
|-id=689 bgcolor=#fefefe
| 606689 ||  || — || August 6, 2005 || Palomar || NEAT ||  || align=right data-sort-value="0.62" | 620 m || 
|-id=690 bgcolor=#fefefe
| 606690 ||  || — || September 29, 2008 || Catalina || CSS ||  || align=right data-sort-value="0.64" | 640 m || 
|-id=691 bgcolor=#fefefe
| 606691 ||  || — || November 30, 2008 || Kitt Peak || Spacewatch ||  || align=right data-sort-value="0.77" | 770 m || 
|-id=692 bgcolor=#fefefe
| 606692 ||  || — || August 16, 2004 || Siding Spring || SSS ||  || align=right data-sort-value="0.78" | 780 m || 
|-id=693 bgcolor=#E9E9E9
| 606693 ||  || — || October 3, 2006 || Mount Lemmon || Mount Lemmon Survey ||  || align=right data-sort-value="0.89" | 890 m || 
|-id=694 bgcolor=#E9E9E9
| 606694 ||  || — || September 12, 1997 || Peking || Xinglong Stn. ||  || align=right data-sort-value="0.77" | 770 m || 
|-id=695 bgcolor=#d6d6d6
| 606695 ||  || — || August 11, 2012 || Siding Spring || SSS ||  || align=right | 2.3 km || 
|-id=696 bgcolor=#d6d6d6
| 606696 ||  || — || August 24, 2012 || Ka-Dar || V. Gerke ||  || align=right | 2.6 km || 
|-id=697 bgcolor=#E9E9E9
| 606697 ||  || — || April 6, 2011 || Mount Lemmon || Mount Lemmon Survey ||  || align=right | 2.1 km || 
|-id=698 bgcolor=#fefefe
| 606698 ||  || — || October 18, 2011 || Mount Lemmon || Mount Lemmon Survey ||  || align=right data-sort-value="0.70" | 700 m || 
|-id=699 bgcolor=#fefefe
| 606699 ||  || — || September 13, 2007 || Mount Lemmon || Mount Lemmon Survey || H || align=right data-sort-value="0.57" | 570 m || 
|-id=700 bgcolor=#E9E9E9
| 606700 ||  || — || December 17, 2006 || Catalina || CSS ||  || align=right | 1.9 km || 
|}

606701–606800 

|-bgcolor=#d6d6d6
| 606701 Golda ||  ||  || August 31, 2013 || Tincana || M. Żołnowski, M. Kusiak ||  || align=right | 2.2 km || 
|-id=702 bgcolor=#FFC2E0
| 606702 ||  || — || October 4, 2018 || Haleakala || Pan-STARRS 2 || APO || align=right data-sort-value="0.33" | 330 m || 
|-id=703 bgcolor=#d6d6d6
| 606703 ||  || — || August 22, 2012 || Crni Vrh || H. Mikuž || Tj (2.99) || align=right | 2.8 km || 
|-id=704 bgcolor=#E9E9E9
| 606704 ||  || — || December 8, 2005 || Kitt Peak || Spacewatch ||  || align=right | 1.5 km || 
|-id=705 bgcolor=#d6d6d6
| 606705 ||  || — || March 26, 2006 || Kitt Peak || Spacewatch ||  || align=right | 2.8 km || 
|-id=706 bgcolor=#fefefe
| 606706 ||  || — || September 25, 2008 || Kitt Peak || Spacewatch ||  || align=right data-sort-value="0.64" | 640 m || 
|-id=707 bgcolor=#d6d6d6
| 606707 ||  || — || June 19, 2006 || Mount Lemmon || Mount Lemmon Survey ||  || align=right | 2.8 km || 
|-id=708 bgcolor=#E9E9E9
| 606708 ||  || — || February 3, 2012 || Haleakala || Pan-STARRS ||  || align=right data-sort-value="0.98" | 980 m || 
|-id=709 bgcolor=#E9E9E9
| 606709 ||  || — || March 20, 2012 || Haleakala || Pan-STARRS ||  || align=right | 1.6 km || 
|-id=710 bgcolor=#fefefe
| 606710 ||  || — || October 25, 2001 || Apache Point || SDSS Collaboration ||  || align=right data-sort-value="0.69" | 690 m || 
|-id=711 bgcolor=#fefefe
| 606711 ||  || — || October 26, 2011 || Haleakala || Pan-STARRS ||  || align=right data-sort-value="0.55" | 550 m || 
|-id=712 bgcolor=#d6d6d6
| 606712 ||  || — || October 10, 2001 || Kitt Peak || Spacewatch ||  || align=right | 2.9 km || 
|-id=713 bgcolor=#fefefe
| 606713 ||  || — || March 19, 2017 || Haleakala || Pan-STARRS ||  || align=right data-sort-value="0.58" | 580 m || 
|-id=714 bgcolor=#E9E9E9
| 606714 ||  || — || September 18, 2009 || Kitt Peak || Spacewatch ||  || align=right | 1.5 km || 
|-id=715 bgcolor=#E9E9E9
| 606715 ||  || — || April 27, 2012 || Haleakala || Pan-STARRS ||  || align=right data-sort-value="0.77" | 770 m || 
|-id=716 bgcolor=#E9E9E9
| 606716 ||  || — || February 6, 2011 || Catalina || CSS ||  || align=right data-sort-value="0.83" | 830 m || 
|-id=717 bgcolor=#E9E9E9
| 606717 ||  || — || February 9, 2007 || Catalina || CSS ||  || align=right | 1.3 km || 
|-id=718 bgcolor=#fefefe
| 606718 ||  || — || September 1, 2005 || Palomar || NEAT || H || align=right data-sort-value="0.67" | 670 m || 
|-id=719 bgcolor=#d6d6d6
| 606719 ||  || — || December 27, 2013 || Oukaimeden || C. Rinner ||  || align=right | 1.9 km || 
|-id=720 bgcolor=#d6d6d6
| 606720 ||  || — || November 6, 2013 || Haleakala || Pan-STARRS ||  || align=right | 2.6 km || 
|-id=721 bgcolor=#E9E9E9
| 606721 ||  || — || October 31, 2014 || Haleakala || Pan-STARRS ||  || align=right | 1.2 km || 
|-id=722 bgcolor=#fefefe
| 606722 ||  || — || September 21, 2011 || Kitt Peak || Spacewatch ||  || align=right data-sort-value="0.59" | 590 m || 
|-id=723 bgcolor=#E9E9E9
| 606723 ||  || — || October 10, 2004 || Socorro || LINEAR ||  || align=right | 1.5 km || 
|-id=724 bgcolor=#fefefe
| 606724 ||  || — || March 27, 2009 || Kitt Peak || Spacewatch || H || align=right data-sort-value="0.52" | 520 m || 
|-id=725 bgcolor=#d6d6d6
| 606725 ||  || — || August 24, 2012 || Kitt Peak || Spacewatch ||  || align=right | 2.9 km || 
|-id=726 bgcolor=#d6d6d6
| 606726 ||  || — || November 13, 2007 || Mount Lemmon || Mount Lemmon Survey ||  || align=right | 2.3 km || 
|-id=727 bgcolor=#d6d6d6
| 606727 ||  || — || April 7, 2003 || Kitt Peak || Spacewatch ||  || align=right | 3.4 km || 
|-id=728 bgcolor=#fefefe
| 606728 ||  || — || August 18, 2014 || Haleakala || Pan-STARRS ||  || align=right data-sort-value="0.61" | 610 m || 
|-id=729 bgcolor=#E9E9E9
| 606729 ||  || — || May 7, 2016 || Haleakala || Pan-STARRS ||  || align=right | 1.3 km || 
|-id=730 bgcolor=#d6d6d6
| 606730 ||  || — || January 21, 2015 || Haleakala || Pan-STARRS ||  || align=right | 2.0 km || 
|-id=731 bgcolor=#E9E9E9
| 606731 ||  || — || November 20, 2009 || Kitt Peak || Spacewatch ||  || align=right | 1.9 km || 
|-id=732 bgcolor=#E9E9E9
| 606732 ||  || — || September 13, 2004 || Goodricke-Pigott || R. A. Tucker ||  || align=right | 1.7 km || 
|-id=733 bgcolor=#d6d6d6
| 606733 ||  || — || October 13, 2007 || Mount Lemmon || Mount Lemmon Survey ||  || align=right | 2.0 km || 
|-id=734 bgcolor=#fefefe
| 606734 ||  || — || January 19, 2012 || Kitt Peak || Spacewatch ||  || align=right data-sort-value="0.72" | 720 m || 
|-id=735 bgcolor=#E9E9E9
| 606735 ||  || — || May 27, 2012 || Mount Lemmon || Mount Lemmon Survey ||  || align=right | 1.5 km || 
|-id=736 bgcolor=#E9E9E9
| 606736 ||  || — || December 14, 2001 || Socorro || LINEAR ||  || align=right | 1.8 km || 
|-id=737 bgcolor=#fefefe
| 606737 ||  || — || October 10, 2007 || Mount Lemmon || Mount Lemmon Survey ||  || align=right data-sort-value="0.62" | 620 m || 
|-id=738 bgcolor=#E9E9E9
| 606738 ||  || — || March 11, 2016 || Haleakala || Pan-STARRS ||  || align=right data-sort-value="0.74" | 740 m || 
|-id=739 bgcolor=#fefefe
| 606739 ||  || — || October 14, 2007 || Catalina || CSS || H || align=right data-sort-value="0.51" | 510 m || 
|-id=740 bgcolor=#d6d6d6
| 606740 ||  || — || September 14, 2007 || Mount Lemmon || Mount Lemmon Survey ||  || align=right | 2.1 km || 
|-id=741 bgcolor=#d6d6d6
| 606741 ||  || — || November 1, 2007 || Kitt Peak || Spacewatch ||  || align=right | 2.1 km || 
|-id=742 bgcolor=#d6d6d6
| 606742 ||  || — || October 8, 2012 || Haleakala || Pan-STARRS ||  || align=right | 2.9 km || 
|-id=743 bgcolor=#E9E9E9
| 606743 ||  || — || October 30, 2005 || Mount Lemmon || Mount Lemmon Survey ||  || align=right | 1.7 km || 
|-id=744 bgcolor=#d6d6d6
| 606744 ||  || — || May 19, 2006 || Mount Lemmon || Mount Lemmon Survey ||  || align=right | 2.6 km || 
|-id=745 bgcolor=#d6d6d6
| 606745 ||  || — || November 3, 2007 || Kitt Peak || Spacewatch ||  || align=right | 1.8 km || 
|-id=746 bgcolor=#E9E9E9
| 606746 ||  || — || October 30, 2005 || Kitt Peak || Spacewatch ||  || align=right data-sort-value="0.98" | 980 m || 
|-id=747 bgcolor=#E9E9E9
| 606747 ||  || — || January 14, 2002 || Kitt Peak || Spacewatch ||  || align=right | 1.4 km || 
|-id=748 bgcolor=#E9E9E9
| 606748 ||  || — || November 23, 2014 || Haleakala || Pan-STARRS ||  || align=right data-sort-value="0.77" | 770 m || 
|-id=749 bgcolor=#d6d6d6
| 606749 ||  || — || January 30, 2015 || Haleakala || Pan-STARRS ||  || align=right | 2.7 km || 
|-id=750 bgcolor=#E9E9E9
| 606750 ||  || — || September 4, 2014 || Haleakala || Pan-STARRS ||  || align=right data-sort-value="0.94" | 940 m || 
|-id=751 bgcolor=#d6d6d6
| 606751 ||  || — || October 15, 2007 || Anderson Mesa || LONEOS ||  || align=right | 2.2 km || 
|-id=752 bgcolor=#fefefe
| 606752 ||  || — || March 26, 2007 || Kitt Peak || Spacewatch ||  || align=right data-sort-value="0.41" | 410 m || 
|-id=753 bgcolor=#E9E9E9
| 606753 ||  || — || November 9, 2009 || Mount Lemmon || Mount Lemmon Survey ||  || align=right | 1.7 km || 
|-id=754 bgcolor=#fefefe
| 606754 ||  || — || October 10, 2018 || Mount Lemmon || Mount Lemmon Survey || H || align=right data-sort-value="0.52" | 520 m || 
|-id=755 bgcolor=#d6d6d6
| 606755 ||  || — || January 19, 2009 || Socorro || LINEAR ||  || align=right | 2.6 km || 
|-id=756 bgcolor=#d6d6d6
| 606756 ||  || — || November 9, 2018 || Haleakala || Pan-STARRS 2 ||  || align=right | 2.3 km || 
|-id=757 bgcolor=#E9E9E9
| 606757 ||  || — || November 2, 2018 || Haleakala || Pan-STARRS 2 ||  || align=right | 2.1 km || 
|-id=758 bgcolor=#E9E9E9
| 606758 ||  || — || November 9, 2018 || Mount Lemmon || Mount Lemmon Survey ||  || align=right | 2.3 km || 
|-id=759 bgcolor=#E9E9E9
| 606759 ||  || — || April 27, 2012 || Haleakala || Pan-STARRS ||  || align=right data-sort-value="0.74" | 740 m || 
|-id=760 bgcolor=#fefefe
| 606760 ||  || — || September 15, 2004 || Siding Spring || SSS || H || align=right data-sort-value="0.96" | 960 m || 
|-id=761 bgcolor=#fefefe
| 606761 ||  || — || June 23, 2012 || Kitt Peak || Spacewatch || H || align=right data-sort-value="0.66" | 660 m || 
|-id=762 bgcolor=#d6d6d6
| 606762 ||  || — || September 15, 2012 || Catalina || CSS ||  || align=right | 2.4 km || 
|-id=763 bgcolor=#E9E9E9
| 606763 ||  || — || January 7, 2010 || Mount Lemmon || Mount Lemmon Survey ||  || align=right | 1.7 km || 
|-id=764 bgcolor=#d6d6d6
| 606764 ||  || — || August 17, 2012 || Siding Spring || SSS || Tj (2.99) || align=right | 3.1 km || 
|-id=765 bgcolor=#E9E9E9
| 606765 ||  || — || December 10, 2010 || Kitt Peak || Spacewatch ||  || align=right | 1.1 km || 
|-id=766 bgcolor=#E9E9E9
| 606766 ||  || — || August 28, 2013 || Haleakala || Pan-STARRS ||  || align=right | 1.3 km || 
|-id=767 bgcolor=#E9E9E9
| 606767 ||  || — || February 27, 2015 || Mount Lemmon || Mount Lemmon Survey ||  || align=right | 2.5 km || 
|-id=768 bgcolor=#E9E9E9
| 606768 ||  || — || September 19, 2009 || Mount Lemmon || Mount Lemmon Survey ||  || align=right | 1.5 km || 
|-id=769 bgcolor=#fefefe
| 606769 ||  || — || March 1, 2004 || Kitt Peak || Spacewatch ||  || align=right data-sort-value="0.97" | 970 m || 
|-id=770 bgcolor=#E9E9E9
| 606770 ||  || — || August 29, 2009 || Kitt Peak || Spacewatch ||  || align=right data-sort-value="0.97" | 970 m || 
|-id=771 bgcolor=#fefefe
| 606771 ||  || — || March 3, 2008 || Siding Spring || SSS || H || align=right data-sort-value="0.89" | 890 m || 
|-id=772 bgcolor=#d6d6d6
| 606772 ||  || — || October 8, 2007 || Mount Lemmon || Mount Lemmon Survey ||  || align=right | 2.0 km || 
|-id=773 bgcolor=#E9E9E9
| 606773 ||  || — || December 16, 2018 || Haleakala || Pan-STARRS ||  || align=right | 1.2 km || 
|-id=774 bgcolor=#fefefe
| 606774 ||  || — || January 3, 2016 || Haleakala || Pan-STARRS || H || align=right data-sort-value="0.58" | 580 m || 
|-id=775 bgcolor=#fefefe
| 606775 ||  || — || July 25, 2015 || Haleakala || Pan-STARRS || H || align=right data-sort-value="0.57" | 570 m || 
|-id=776 bgcolor=#fefefe
| 606776 ||  || — || October 13, 2015 || Catalina || CSS || H || align=right data-sort-value="0.62" | 620 m || 
|-id=777 bgcolor=#fefefe
| 606777 ||  || — || December 30, 2013 || Mount Lemmon || Mount Lemmon Survey || H || align=right data-sort-value="0.57" | 570 m || 
|-id=778 bgcolor=#d6d6d6
| 606778 ||  || — || March 30, 2015 || Haleakala || Pan-STARRS ||  || align=right | 2.6 km || 
|-id=779 bgcolor=#fefefe
| 606779 ||  || — || November 7, 2007 || Kitt Peak || Spacewatch ||  || align=right data-sort-value="0.74" | 740 m || 
|-id=780 bgcolor=#fefefe
| 606780 ||  || — || October 19, 2007 || Kitt Peak || Spacewatch ||  || align=right data-sort-value="0.51" | 510 m || 
|-id=781 bgcolor=#d6d6d6
| 606781 ||  || — || October 8, 2012 || Haleakala || Pan-STARRS ||  || align=right | 2.9 km || 
|-id=782 bgcolor=#fefefe
| 606782 ||  || — || December 12, 2014 || Haleakala || Pan-STARRS ||  || align=right data-sort-value="0.64" | 640 m || 
|-id=783 bgcolor=#E9E9E9
| 606783 ||  || — || November 30, 2008 || Kitt Peak || Spacewatch ||  || align=right | 2.5 km || 
|-id=784 bgcolor=#d6d6d6
| 606784 ||  || — || October 8, 2012 || Mount Lemmon || Mount Lemmon Survey ||  || align=right | 2.6 km || 
|-id=785 bgcolor=#fefefe
| 606785 ||  || — || February 28, 2008 || Mount Lemmon || Mount Lemmon Survey ||  || align=right data-sort-value="0.71" | 710 m || 
|-id=786 bgcolor=#fefefe
| 606786 ||  || — || August 10, 2004 || Campo Imperatore || A. Boattini, F. De Luise ||  || align=right data-sort-value="0.69" | 690 m || 
|-id=787 bgcolor=#E9E9E9
| 606787 ||  || — || February 7, 2002 || Kitt Peak || Spacewatch ||  || align=right | 1.0 km || 
|-id=788 bgcolor=#fefefe
| 606788 ||  || — || April 25, 2017 || Mount Lemmon || Mount Lemmon Survey || H || align=right data-sort-value="0.75" | 750 m || 
|-id=789 bgcolor=#fefefe
| 606789 ||  || — || August 27, 2005 || Palomar || NEAT || H || align=right data-sort-value="0.52" | 520 m || 
|-id=790 bgcolor=#d6d6d6
| 606790 ||  || — || October 24, 2016 || Mount Lemmon || Mount Lemmon Survey || Tj (2.99) || align=right | 4.5 km || 
|-id=791 bgcolor=#d6d6d6
| 606791 ||  || — || October 23, 2012 || Catalina || CSS ||  || align=right | 3.2 km || 
|-id=792 bgcolor=#d6d6d6
| 606792 ||  || — || September 11, 2007 || Mount Lemmon || Mount Lemmon Survey ||  || align=right | 2.7 km || 
|-id=793 bgcolor=#E9E9E9
| 606793 ||  || — || September 22, 2009 || Mount Lemmon || Mount Lemmon Survey ||  || align=right | 1.7 km || 
|-id=794 bgcolor=#d6d6d6
| 606794 ||  || — || November 26, 2012 || Mount Lemmon || Mount Lemmon Survey ||  || align=right | 2.2 km || 
|-id=795 bgcolor=#fefefe
| 606795 ||  || — || April 28, 2004 || Kitt Peak || Spacewatch ||  || align=right data-sort-value="0.82" | 820 m || 
|-id=796 bgcolor=#d6d6d6
| 606796 ||  || — || January 7, 2002 || Kitt Peak || Spacewatch ||  || align=right | 2.6 km || 
|-id=797 bgcolor=#fefefe
| 606797 ||  || — || February 1, 2012 || Kitt Peak || Spacewatch ||  || align=right data-sort-value="0.80" | 800 m || 
|-id=798 bgcolor=#fefefe
| 606798 ||  || — || September 10, 2010 || Dauban || C. Rinner, F. Kugel ||  || align=right data-sort-value="0.70" | 700 m || 
|-id=799 bgcolor=#fefefe
| 606799 ||  || — || December 31, 2007 || Kitt Peak || Spacewatch ||  || align=right data-sort-value="0.79" | 790 m || 
|-id=800 bgcolor=#d6d6d6
| 606800 ||  || — || February 28, 2019 || Mount Lemmon || Mount Lemmon Survey ||  || align=right | 2.6 km || 
|}

606801–606900 

|-bgcolor=#fefefe
| 606801 ||  || — || January 16, 2008 || Mount Lemmon || Mount Lemmon Survey ||  || align=right data-sort-value="0.94" | 940 m || 
|-id=802 bgcolor=#fefefe
| 606802 ||  || — || September 12, 2013 || Mount Lemmon || Mount Lemmon Survey ||  || align=right data-sort-value="0.91" | 910 m || 
|-id=803 bgcolor=#E9E9E9
| 606803 ||  || — || May 3, 2006 || Catalina || CSS ||  || align=right | 1.2 km || 
|-id=804 bgcolor=#fefefe
| 606804 ||  || — || February 10, 2008 || Catalina || CSS || H || align=right data-sort-value="0.62" | 620 m || 
|-id=805 bgcolor=#E9E9E9
| 606805 ||  || — || February 10, 2014 || Haleakala || Pan-STARRS ||  || align=right | 2.4 km || 
|-id=806 bgcolor=#fefefe
| 606806 ||  || — || January 18, 2015 || Haleakala || Pan-STARRS ||  || align=right data-sort-value="0.80" | 800 m || 
|-id=807 bgcolor=#fefefe
| 606807 ||  || — || September 24, 2006 || Kitt Peak || Spacewatch ||  || align=right data-sort-value="0.83" | 830 m || 
|-id=808 bgcolor=#E9E9E9
| 606808 ||  || — || October 12, 2007 || Kitt Peak || Spacewatch ||  || align=right | 1.7 km || 
|-id=809 bgcolor=#E9E9E9
| 606809 ||  || — || September 27, 2003 || Kitt Peak || Spacewatch ||  || align=right | 1.2 km || 
|-id=810 bgcolor=#d6d6d6
| 606810 ||  || — || March 25, 2003 || Kitt Peak || Spacewatch ||  || align=right | 2.1 km || 
|-id=811 bgcolor=#E9E9E9
| 606811 ||  || — || August 3, 2016 || Haleakala || Pan-STARRS ||  || align=right | 1.3 km || 
|-id=812 bgcolor=#E9E9E9
| 606812 ||  || — || December 22, 2008 || Kitt Peak || Spacewatch ||  || align=right | 1.5 km || 
|-id=813 bgcolor=#d6d6d6
| 606813 ||  || — || April 5, 2014 || Haleakala || Pan-STARRS ||  || align=right | 2.0 km || 
|-id=814 bgcolor=#fefefe
| 606814 ||  || — || August 11, 2001 || Palomar || NEAT || H || align=right data-sort-value="0.90" | 900 m || 
|-id=815 bgcolor=#FA8072
| 606815 ||  || — || August 16, 2001 || Palomar || NEAT || H || align=right data-sort-value="0.73" | 730 m || 
|-id=816 bgcolor=#E9E9E9
| 606816 ||  || — || November 2, 2008 || Mount Lemmon || Mount Lemmon Survey ||  || align=right | 1.9 km || 
|-id=817 bgcolor=#fefefe
| 606817 ||  || — || February 28, 2009 || Mount Lemmon || Mount Lemmon Survey ||  || align=right data-sort-value="0.55" | 550 m || 
|-id=818 bgcolor=#fefefe
| 606818 ||  || — || November 27, 2010 || Mount Lemmon || Mount Lemmon Survey ||  || align=right data-sort-value="0.86" | 860 m || 
|-id=819 bgcolor=#fefefe
| 606819 ||  || — || April 24, 2012 || Mount Lemmon || Mount Lemmon Survey ||  || align=right data-sort-value="0.53" | 530 m || 
|-id=820 bgcolor=#E9E9E9
| 606820 ||  || — || February 25, 2006 || Kitt Peak || Spacewatch ||  || align=right | 1.3 km || 
|-id=821 bgcolor=#E9E9E9
| 606821 ||  || — || October 9, 2007 || Mount Lemmon || Mount Lemmon Survey ||  || align=right | 1.5 km || 
|-id=822 bgcolor=#fefefe
| 606822 ||  || — || January 26, 2011 || Kitt Peak || Spacewatch ||  || align=right data-sort-value="0.74" | 740 m || 
|-id=823 bgcolor=#E9E9E9
| 606823 ||  || — || March 11, 2005 || Kitt Peak || Spacewatch ||  || align=right | 2.5 km || 
|-id=824 bgcolor=#fefefe
| 606824 ||  || — || February 24, 2006 || Kitt Peak || Spacewatch ||  || align=right data-sort-value="0.57" | 570 m || 
|-id=825 bgcolor=#C2FFFF
| 606825 ||  || — || March 29, 2008 || Kitt Peak || Spacewatch || L5 || align=right | 7.0 km || 
|-id=826 bgcolor=#E9E9E9
| 606826 ||  || — || September 27, 2003 || Kitt Peak || Spacewatch ||  || align=right | 1.2 km || 
|-id=827 bgcolor=#C2FFFF
| 606827 ||  || — || July 28, 2011 || Haleakala || Pan-STARRS || L5 || align=right | 8.1 km || 
|-id=828 bgcolor=#fefefe
| 606828 ||  || — || September 11, 2010 || Mount Lemmon || Mount Lemmon Survey ||  || align=right data-sort-value="0.73" | 730 m || 
|-id=829 bgcolor=#d6d6d6
| 606829 ||  || — || February 9, 2008 || Mount Lemmon || Mount Lemmon Survey ||  || align=right | 2.9 km || 
|-id=830 bgcolor=#C2FFFF
| 606830 ||  || — || November 8, 2016 || Haleakala || Pan-STARRS || L5 || align=right | 7.1 km || 
|-id=831 bgcolor=#C2FFFF
| 606831 ||  || — || October 27, 2014 || Haleakala || Pan-STARRS || L5 || align=right | 8.3 km || 
|-id=832 bgcolor=#E9E9E9
| 606832 ||  || — || May 12, 2011 || Mount Lemmon || Mount Lemmon Survey ||  || align=right | 1.6 km || 
|-id=833 bgcolor=#E9E9E9
| 606833 ||  || — || January 29, 2014 || Kitt Peak || Spacewatch ||  || align=right | 1.7 km || 
|-id=834 bgcolor=#E9E9E9
| 606834 ||  || — || April 15, 2015 || Kitt Peak || Spacewatch ||  || align=right data-sort-value="0.68" | 680 m || 
|-id=835 bgcolor=#fefefe
| 606835 ||  || — || April 29, 2008 || Kitt Peak || Spacewatch ||  || align=right data-sort-value="0.59" | 590 m || 
|-id=836 bgcolor=#d6d6d6
| 606836 ||  || — || September 17, 2010 || Mount Lemmon || Mount Lemmon Survey ||  || align=right | 1.8 km || 
|-id=837 bgcolor=#d6d6d6
| 606837 ||  || — || April 3, 2019 || Haleakala || Pan-STARRS ||  || align=right | 1.8 km || 
|-id=838 bgcolor=#d6d6d6
| 606838 ||  || — || April 2, 2019 || Haleakala || Pan-STARRS ||  || align=right | 2.2 km || 
|-id=839 bgcolor=#d6d6d6
| 606839 ||  || — || April 3, 2019 || Haleakala || Pan-STARRS ||  || align=right | 2.2 km || 
|-id=840 bgcolor=#d6d6d6
| 606840 ||  || — || December 13, 2017 || Haleakala || Pan-STARRS ||  || align=right | 2.3 km || 
|-id=841 bgcolor=#E9E9E9
| 606841 ||  || — || January 23, 2006 || Kitt Peak || Spacewatch ||  || align=right | 1.2 km || 
|-id=842 bgcolor=#d6d6d6
| 606842 ||  || — || April 30, 2008 || Catalina || CSS || Tj (2.97) || align=right | 3.7 km || 
|-id=843 bgcolor=#FA8072
| 606843 ||  || — || April 5, 2019 || Haleakala || Pan-STARRS ||  || align=right data-sort-value="0.43" | 430 m || 
|-id=844 bgcolor=#FA8072
| 606844 ||  || — || April 11, 2003 || Kitt Peak || Spacewatch ||  || align=right data-sort-value="0.62" | 620 m || 
|-id=845 bgcolor=#FA8072
| 606845 ||  || — || January 17, 2011 || Mount Lemmon || Mount Lemmon Survey || H || align=right data-sort-value="0.61" | 610 m || 
|-id=846 bgcolor=#E9E9E9
| 606846 ||  || — || February 21, 2014 || Haleakala || Pan-STARRS ||  || align=right | 2.5 km || 
|-id=847 bgcolor=#d6d6d6
| 606847 ||  || — || March 18, 2013 || Mount Lemmon || Mount Lemmon Survey ||  || align=right | 2.4 km || 
|-id=848 bgcolor=#d6d6d6
| 606848 ||  || — || March 4, 2008 || Mount Lemmon || Mount Lemmon Survey ||  || align=right | 2.5 km || 
|-id=849 bgcolor=#d6d6d6
| 606849 ||  || — || January 20, 2018 || Mount Lemmon || Mount Lemmon Survey ||  || align=right | 2.6 km || 
|-id=850 bgcolor=#d6d6d6
| 606850 ||  || — || October 7, 2004 || Kitt Peak || Spacewatch ||  || align=right | 1.9 km || 
|-id=851 bgcolor=#fefefe
| 606851 ||  || — || March 9, 2015 || Mount Lemmon || Mount Lemmon Survey ||  || align=right data-sort-value="0.64" | 640 m || 
|-id=852 bgcolor=#d6d6d6
| 606852 ||  || — || September 10, 2015 || Haleakala || Pan-STARRS ||  || align=right | 2.7 km || 
|-id=853 bgcolor=#E9E9E9
| 606853 ||  || — || January 19, 2005 || Kitt Peak || Spacewatch ||  || align=right | 1.5 km || 
|-id=854 bgcolor=#E9E9E9
| 606854 ||  || — || November 19, 2007 || Kitt Peak || Spacewatch ||  || align=right | 3.5 km || 
|-id=855 bgcolor=#d6d6d6
| 606855 ||  || — || September 9, 2015 || Haleakala || Pan-STARRS ||  || align=right | 1.8 km || 
|-id=856 bgcolor=#E9E9E9
| 606856 ||  || — || April 12, 2005 || Kitt Peak || Spacewatch ||  || align=right | 2.0 km || 
|-id=857 bgcolor=#d6d6d6
| 606857 ||  || — || May 2, 2008 || Kitt Peak || Spacewatch ||  || align=right | 2.2 km || 
|-id=858 bgcolor=#d6d6d6
| 606858 ||  || — || November 10, 2010 || Mount Lemmon || Mount Lemmon Survey ||  || align=right | 2.3 km || 
|-id=859 bgcolor=#fefefe
| 606859 ||  || — || February 4, 2009 || Mount Lemmon || Mount Lemmon Survey ||  || align=right data-sort-value="0.53" | 530 m || 
|-id=860 bgcolor=#fefefe
| 606860 ||  || — || September 13, 2005 || Kitt Peak || Spacewatch ||  || align=right data-sort-value="0.62" | 620 m || 
|-id=861 bgcolor=#d6d6d6
| 606861 ||  || — || July 25, 2015 || Haleakala || Pan-STARRS ||  || align=right | 2.5 km || 
|-id=862 bgcolor=#d6d6d6
| 606862 ||  || — || May 28, 2014 || Mount Lemmon || Mount Lemmon Survey ||  || align=right | 1.9 km || 
|-id=863 bgcolor=#d6d6d6
| 606863 ||  || — || March 12, 2013 || Kitt Peak || Spacewatch ||  || align=right | 2.5 km || 
|-id=864 bgcolor=#E9E9E9
| 606864 ||  || — || May 21, 2006 || Mount Lemmon || Mount Lemmon Survey ||  || align=right | 1.2 km || 
|-id=865 bgcolor=#E9E9E9
| 606865 ||  || — || May 25, 2006 || Mount Lemmon || Mount Lemmon Survey ||  || align=right | 1.2 km || 
|-id=866 bgcolor=#d6d6d6
| 606866 ||  || — || April 6, 2008 || Mount Lemmon || Mount Lemmon Survey ||  || align=right | 2.3 km || 
|-id=867 bgcolor=#fefefe
| 606867 ||  || — || December 30, 2014 || Oukaimeden || M. Ory ||  || align=right data-sort-value="0.70" | 700 m || 
|-id=868 bgcolor=#E9E9E9
| 606868 ||  || — || November 14, 2012 || Kitt Peak || Spacewatch ||  || align=right data-sort-value="0.76" | 760 m || 
|-id=869 bgcolor=#E9E9E9
| 606869 ||  || — || November 13, 2012 || Mount Lemmon || Mount Lemmon Survey ||  || align=right data-sort-value="0.96" | 960 m || 
|-id=870 bgcolor=#d6d6d6
| 606870 ||  || — || May 7, 2014 || Haleakala || Pan-STARRS ||  || align=right | 1.6 km || 
|-id=871 bgcolor=#E9E9E9
| 606871 ||  || — || November 1, 2007 || Kitt Peak || Spacewatch ||  || align=right | 1.8 km || 
|-id=872 bgcolor=#E9E9E9
| 606872 ||  || — || November 7, 2007 || Mount Lemmon || Mount Lemmon Survey ||  || align=right | 1.9 km || 
|-id=873 bgcolor=#d6d6d6
| 606873 ||  || — || November 8, 2007 || Mount Lemmon || Mount Lemmon Survey ||  || align=right | 1.9 km || 
|-id=874 bgcolor=#d6d6d6
| 606874 ||  || — || November 8, 2010 || Mount Lemmon || Mount Lemmon Survey ||  || align=right | 2.8 km || 
|-id=875 bgcolor=#d6d6d6
| 606875 ||  || — || December 13, 2012 || Mayhill || N. Falla ||  || align=right | 2.2 km || 
|-id=876 bgcolor=#E9E9E9
| 606876 ||  || — || April 9, 2006 || Kitt Peak || Spacewatch ||  || align=right | 1.5 km || 
|-id=877 bgcolor=#d6d6d6
| 606877 ||  || — || November 25, 2005 || Kitt Peak || Spacewatch ||  || align=right | 2.8 km || 
|-id=878 bgcolor=#fefefe
| 606878 ||  || — || January 21, 2015 || Haleakala || Pan-STARRS ||  || align=right data-sort-value="0.58" | 580 m || 
|-id=879 bgcolor=#E9E9E9
| 606879 ||  || — || May 21, 2015 || Haleakala || Pan-STARRS ||  || align=right data-sort-value="0.92" | 920 m || 
|-id=880 bgcolor=#fefefe
| 606880 ||  || — || May 21, 2012 || Mount Lemmon || Mount Lemmon Survey ||  || align=right data-sort-value="0.56" | 560 m || 
|-id=881 bgcolor=#fefefe
| 606881 ||  || — || August 19, 2012 || Siding Spring || SSS ||  || align=right data-sort-value="0.94" | 940 m || 
|-id=882 bgcolor=#E9E9E9
| 606882 ||  || — || December 6, 2012 || Mount Lemmon || Mount Lemmon Survey ||  || align=right | 1.3 km || 
|-id=883 bgcolor=#d6d6d6
| 606883 ||  || — || September 8, 2015 || Haleakala || Pan-STARRS ||  || align=right | 2.3 km || 
|-id=884 bgcolor=#d6d6d6
| 606884 ||  || — || November 2, 2010 || Mount Lemmon || Mount Lemmon Survey ||  || align=right | 2.1 km || 
|-id=885 bgcolor=#d6d6d6
| 606885 ||  || — || April 6, 2014 || Mount Lemmon || Mount Lemmon Survey ||  || align=right | 2.0 km || 
|-id=886 bgcolor=#d6d6d6
| 606886 ||  || — || February 10, 2007 || Mount Lemmon || Mount Lemmon Survey ||  || align=right | 2.4 km || 
|-id=887 bgcolor=#d6d6d6
| 606887 ||  || — || May 9, 2014 || Haleakala || Pan-STARRS ||  || align=right | 2.7 km || 
|-id=888 bgcolor=#d6d6d6
| 606888 ||  || — || June 20, 2014 || Haleakala || Pan-STARRS ||  || align=right | 2.8 km || 
|-id=889 bgcolor=#d6d6d6
| 606889 ||  || — || May 14, 2008 || Mount Lemmon || Mount Lemmon Survey ||  || align=right | 2.4 km || 
|-id=890 bgcolor=#E9E9E9
| 606890 ||  || — || November 3, 2007 || Kitt Peak || Spacewatch ||  || align=right | 1.5 km || 
|-id=891 bgcolor=#E9E9E9
| 606891 ||  || — || September 4, 2011 || Kitt Peak || Spacewatch ||  || align=right | 1.6 km || 
|-id=892 bgcolor=#E9E9E9
| 606892 ||  || — || May 13, 2015 || Mount Lemmon || Mount Lemmon Survey ||  || align=right data-sort-value="0.92" | 920 m || 
|-id=893 bgcolor=#E9E9E9
| 606893 ||  || — || September 8, 2011 || Kitt Peak || Spacewatch ||  || align=right | 2.2 km || 
|-id=894 bgcolor=#d6d6d6
| 606894 ||  || — || November 26, 2016 || Mount Lemmon || Mount Lemmon Survey ||  || align=right | 2.3 km || 
|-id=895 bgcolor=#fefefe
| 606895 ||  || — || August 29, 2013 || Haleakala || Pan-STARRS ||  || align=right data-sort-value="0.56" | 560 m || 
|-id=896 bgcolor=#fefefe
| 606896 ||  || — || September 27, 2009 || Mount Lemmon || Mount Lemmon Survey ||  || align=right data-sort-value="0.50" | 500 m || 
|-id=897 bgcolor=#E9E9E9
| 606897 ||  || — || March 1, 2009 || Kitt Peak || Spacewatch ||  || align=right | 2.1 km || 
|-id=898 bgcolor=#E9E9E9
| 606898 ||  || — || May 25, 2015 || Haleakala || Pan-STARRS ||  || align=right | 1.5 km || 
|-id=899 bgcolor=#d6d6d6
| 606899 ||  || — || September 18, 2006 || Kitt Peak || Spacewatch ||  || align=right | 2.7 km || 
|-id=900 bgcolor=#FFC2E0
| 606900 ||  || — || May 12, 2019 || Haleakala || Pan-STARRS || AMO || align=right data-sort-value="0.29" | 290 m || 
|}

606901–607000 

|-bgcolor=#E9E9E9
| 606901 ||  || — || October 13, 2012 || Haleakala || Pan-STARRS ||  || align=right | 1.9 km || 
|-id=902 bgcolor=#E9E9E9
| 606902 ||  || — || April 2, 2014 || Mount Lemmon || Mount Lemmon Survey ||  || align=right | 1.7 km || 
|-id=903 bgcolor=#E9E9E9
| 606903 ||  || — || May 8, 2019 || Haleakala || Pan-STARRS ||  || align=right | 1.2 km || 
|-id=904 bgcolor=#d6d6d6
| 606904 ||  || — || May 7, 2019 || Haleakala || Pan-STARRS ||  || align=right | 2.2 km || 
|-id=905 bgcolor=#d6d6d6
| 606905 ||  || — || May 11, 2019 || Haleakala || Pan-STARRS ||  || align=right | 2.5 km || 
|-id=906 bgcolor=#C2FFFF
| 606906 ||  || — || March 9, 2018 || Mount Lemmon || Mount Lemmon Survey || L5 || align=right | 8.4 km || 
|-id=907 bgcolor=#FA8072
| 606907 ||  || — || September 12, 2010 || La Sagra || OAM Obs. ||  || align=right data-sort-value="0.65" | 650 m || 
|-id=908 bgcolor=#FFC2E0
| 606908 ||  || — || February 25, 2006 || Kitt Peak || Spacewatch || AMO || align=right data-sort-value="0.74" | 740 m || 
|-id=909 bgcolor=#fefefe
| 606909 ||  || — || April 27, 2016 || Haleakala || Pan-STARRS || H || align=right data-sort-value="0.58" | 580 m || 
|-id=910 bgcolor=#E9E9E9
| 606910 ||  || — || May 30, 2019 || Haleakala || Pan-STARRS ||  || align=right | 1.3 km || 
|-id=911 bgcolor=#d6d6d6
| 606911 ||  || — || April 1, 2003 || Apache Point || SDSS Collaboration ||  || align=right | 2.1 km || 
|-id=912 bgcolor=#d6d6d6
| 606912 ||  || — || May 26, 2019 || Haleakala || Pan-STARRS ||  || align=right | 1.9 km || 
|-id=913 bgcolor=#d6d6d6
| 606913 ||  || — || September 29, 2009 || Mount Lemmon || Mount Lemmon Survey ||  || align=right | 2.3 km || 
|-id=914 bgcolor=#fefefe
| 606914 ||  || — || October 10, 1996 || Kitt Peak || Spacewatch || H || align=right data-sort-value="0.50" | 500 m || 
|-id=915 bgcolor=#fefefe
| 606915 ||  || — || August 4, 2012 || Haleakala || Pan-STARRS ||  || align=right data-sort-value="0.67" | 670 m || 
|-id=916 bgcolor=#E9E9E9
| 606916 ||  || — || June 11, 2015 || Haleakala || Pan-STARRS ||  || align=right data-sort-value="0.87" | 870 m || 
|-id=917 bgcolor=#C2FFFF
| 606917 ||  || — || June 30, 2019 || Haleakala || Pan-STARRS || L4 || align=right | 6.4 km || 
|-id=918 bgcolor=#C2FFFF
| 606918 ||  || — || February 23, 2015 || Haleakala || Pan-STARRS || L4 || align=right | 7.1 km || 
|-id=919 bgcolor=#E9E9E9
| 606919 ||  || — || August 22, 2011 || Haleakala || Pan-STARRS ||  || align=right | 1.8 km || 
|-id=920 bgcolor=#E9E9E9
| 606920 ||  || — || July 30, 2011 || Siding Spring || SSS ||  || align=right | 1.7 km || 
|-id=921 bgcolor=#E9E9E9
| 606921 ||  || — || June 26, 2015 || Haleakala || Pan-STARRS ||  || align=right data-sort-value="0.62" | 620 m || 
|-id=922 bgcolor=#fefefe
| 606922 ||  || — || March 29, 2008 || Mount Lemmon || Mount Lemmon Survey ||  || align=right data-sort-value="0.83" | 830 m || 
|-id=923 bgcolor=#C2FFFF
| 606923 ||  || — || January 10, 2013 || Haleakala || Pan-STARRS || L4 || align=right | 5.8 km || 
|-id=924 bgcolor=#E9E9E9
| 606924 ||  || — || July 1, 2019 || Haleakala || Pan-STARRS ||  || align=right | 1.3 km || 
|-id=925 bgcolor=#d6d6d6
| 606925 ||  || — || August 26, 2008 || La Sagra || OAM Obs. ||  || align=right | 2.1 km || 
|-id=926 bgcolor=#fefefe
| 606926 ||  || — || December 7, 2012 || Haleakala || Pan-STARRS ||  || align=right | 1.1 km || 
|-id=927 bgcolor=#C2FFFF
| 606927 ||  || — || July 4, 2019 || Haleakala || Pan-STARRS || L4 || align=right | 5.9 km || 
|-id=928 bgcolor=#d6d6d6
| 606928 ||  || — || December 27, 2016 || Mount Lemmon || Mount Lemmon Survey || Tj (2.97) || align=right | 4.3 km || 
|-id=929 bgcolor=#C2FFFF
| 606929 ||  || — || February 28, 2014 || Haleakala || Pan-STARRS || L4 || align=right | 6.3 km || 
|-id=930 bgcolor=#fefefe
| 606930 ||  || — || March 12, 2008 || Kitt Peak || Spacewatch ||  || align=right data-sort-value="0.59" | 590 m || 
|-id=931 bgcolor=#E9E9E9
| 606931 ||  || — || July 21, 2006 || Catalina || CSS ||  || align=right | 1.7 km || 
|-id=932 bgcolor=#fefefe
| 606932 ||  || — || April 11, 2007 || Kitt Peak || Spacewatch ||  || align=right data-sort-value="0.70" | 700 m || 
|-id=933 bgcolor=#C2FFFF
| 606933 ||  || — || March 21, 2015 || Haleakala || Pan-STARRS || L4 || align=right | 8.1 km || 
|-id=934 bgcolor=#FA8072
| 606934 ||  || — || July 18, 2012 || Siding Spring || SSS ||  || align=right data-sort-value="0.64" | 640 m || 
|-id=935 bgcolor=#E9E9E9
| 606935 ||  || — || July 25, 2015 || Haleakala || Pan-STARRS ||  || align=right data-sort-value="0.95" | 950 m || 
|-id=936 bgcolor=#C2FFFF
| 606936 ||  || — || June 18, 2018 || Haleakala || Pan-STARRS || L4 || align=right | 6.0 km || 
|-id=937 bgcolor=#E9E9E9
| 606937 ||  || — || December 1, 2011 || Haleakala || Pan-STARRS ||  || align=right | 1.0 km || 
|-id=938 bgcolor=#E9E9E9
| 606938 ||  || — || July 13, 2019 || Haleakala || Pan-STARRS ||  || align=right data-sort-value="0.65" | 650 m || 
|-id=939 bgcolor=#FFC2E0
| 606939 ||  || — || September 22, 2019 || Haleakala || Pan-STARRS || AMO || align=right data-sort-value="0.15" | 150 m || 
|-id=940 bgcolor=#fefefe
| 606940 ||  || — || June 13, 2016 || Haleakala || Pan-STARRS || H || align=right data-sort-value="0.63" | 630 m || 
|-id=941 bgcolor=#FA8072
| 606941 ||  || — || August 8, 2019 || Haleakala || Pan-STARRS ||  || align=right data-sort-value="0.45" | 450 m || 
|-id=942 bgcolor=#E9E9E9
| 606942 ||  || — || September 25, 2019 || Haleakala || Pan-STARRS ||  || align=right | 1.2 km || 
|-id=943 bgcolor=#E9E9E9
| 606943 ||  || — || April 5, 2014 || Haleakala || Pan-STARRS ||  || align=right data-sort-value="0.89" | 890 m || 
|-id=944 bgcolor=#d6d6d6
| 606944 ||  || — || June 12, 2008 || Kitt Peak || Spacewatch ||  || align=right | 3.2 km || 
|-id=945 bgcolor=#d6d6d6
| 606945 ||  || — || April 5, 2011 || Mount Lemmon || Mount Lemmon Survey ||  || align=right | 2.3 km || 
|-id=946 bgcolor=#d6d6d6
| 606946 ||  || — || November 11, 2005 || Kitt Peak || Spacewatch ||  || align=right | 2.6 km || 
|-id=947 bgcolor=#E9E9E9
| 606947 ||  || — || July 2, 2014 || Haleakala || Pan-STARRS ||  || align=right data-sort-value="0.91" | 910 m || 
|-id=948 bgcolor=#E9E9E9
| 606948 ||  || — || November 13, 2010 || Mount Lemmon || Mount Lemmon Survey ||  || align=right | 1.7 km || 
|-id=949 bgcolor=#fefefe
| 606949 ||  || — || February 3, 2008 || Catalina || CSS || H || align=right data-sort-value="0.55" | 550 m || 
|-id=950 bgcolor=#d6d6d6
| 606950 ||  || — || September 30, 2003 || Kitt Peak || Spacewatch ||  || align=right | 1.4 km || 
|-id=951 bgcolor=#E9E9E9
| 606951 ||  || — || September 19, 2014 || Haleakala || Pan-STARRS ||  || align=right | 1.2 km || 
|-id=952 bgcolor=#E9E9E9
| 606952 ||  || — || September 28, 2002 || Haleakala || AMOS ||  || align=right | 1.3 km || 
|-id=953 bgcolor=#FA8072
| 606953 ||  || — || November 28, 2019 || Haleakala || Pan-STARRS || H || align=right data-sort-value="0.45" | 450 m || 
|-id=954 bgcolor=#E9E9E9
| 606954 ||  || — || April 9, 2016 || Haleakala || Pan-STARRS ||  || align=right | 1.7 km || 
|-id=955 bgcolor=#E9E9E9
| 606955 ||  || — || March 17, 2012 || Mount Lemmon || Mount Lemmon Survey ||  || align=right | 1.7 km || 
|-id=956 bgcolor=#fefefe
| 606956 ||  || — || March 28, 2018 || Mount Lemmon || Mount Lemmon Survey || H || align=right data-sort-value="0.45" | 450 m || 
|-id=957 bgcolor=#E9E9E9
| 606957 ||  || — || September 7, 2019 || Palomar || PTF ||  || align=right | 1.3 km || 
|-id=958 bgcolor=#fefefe
| 606958 ||  || — || December 3, 2019 || Haleakala || Pan-STARRS 2 || H || align=right data-sort-value="0.51" | 510 m || 
|-id=959 bgcolor=#E9E9E9
| 606959 ||  || — || November 27, 2014 || Haleakala || Pan-STARRS ||  || align=right | 1.7 km || 
|-id=960 bgcolor=#fefefe
| 606960 ||  || — || December 7, 2019 || Mount Lemmon || Mount Lemmon Survey || H || align=right data-sort-value="0.40" | 400 m || 
|-id=961 bgcolor=#FA8072
| 606961 ||  || — || March 3, 2006 || Catalina || CSS ||  || align=right data-sort-value="0.63" | 630 m || 
|-id=962 bgcolor=#fefefe
| 606962 ||  || — || August 1, 2016 || Haleakala || Pan-STARRS ||  || align=right data-sort-value="0.30" | 300 m || 
|-id=963 bgcolor=#fefefe
| 606963 ||  || — || September 12, 2007 || Catalina || CSS ||  || align=right data-sort-value="0.79" | 790 m || 
|-id=964 bgcolor=#fefefe
| 606964 ||  || — || June 14, 2005 || Kitt Peak || Spacewatch ||  || align=right data-sort-value="0.76" | 760 m || 
|-id=965 bgcolor=#E9E9E9
| 606965 ||  || — || February 17, 2007 || Kitt Peak || Spacewatch ||  || align=right data-sort-value="0.84" | 840 m || 
|-id=966 bgcolor=#E9E9E9
| 606966 ||  || — || November 10, 2013 || Mount Lemmon || Mount Lemmon Survey ||  || align=right data-sort-value="0.85" | 850 m || 
|-id=967 bgcolor=#E9E9E9
| 606967 ||  || — || September 5, 2008 || Kitt Peak || Spacewatch ||  || align=right | 2.1 km || 
|-id=968 bgcolor=#fefefe
| 606968 ||  || — || April 4, 2005 || Catalina || CSS ||  || align=right data-sort-value="0.65" | 650 m || 
|-id=969 bgcolor=#fefefe
| 606969 ||  || — || May 10, 2013 || Kitt Peak || Spacewatch ||  || align=right data-sort-value="0.60" | 600 m || 
|-id=970 bgcolor=#fefefe
| 606970 ||  || — || June 7, 2013 || Haleakala || Pan-STARRS ||  || align=right data-sort-value="0.54" | 540 m || 
|-id=971 bgcolor=#fefefe
| 606971 ||  || — || April 21, 2009 || Kitt Peak || Spacewatch ||  || align=right data-sort-value="0.55" | 550 m || 
|-id=972 bgcolor=#E9E9E9
| 606972 ||  || — || January 17, 2015 || Haleakala || Pan-STARRS ||  || align=right data-sort-value="0.81" | 810 m || 
|-id=973 bgcolor=#E9E9E9
| 606973 ||  || — || June 5, 2016 || Haleakala || Pan-STARRS ||  || align=right data-sort-value="0.77" | 770 m || 
|-id=974 bgcolor=#E9E9E9
| 606974 ||  || — || December 7, 2012 || Haleakala || Pan-STARRS ||  || align=right | 1.6 km || 
|-id=975 bgcolor=#fefefe
| 606975 ||  || — || July 25, 2017 || Haleakala || Pan-STARRS ||  || align=right data-sort-value="0.54" | 540 m || 
|-id=976 bgcolor=#fefefe
| 606976 ||  || — || March 30, 2016 || Haleakala || Pan-STARRS ||  || align=right data-sort-value="0.64" | 640 m || 
|-id=977 bgcolor=#E9E9E9
| 606977 ||  || — || October 8, 2008 || Kitt Peak || Spacewatch ||  || align=right | 1.1 km || 
|-id=978 bgcolor=#fefefe
| 606978 ||  || — || October 24, 2011 || Haleakala || Pan-STARRS ||  || align=right data-sort-value="0.62" | 620 m || 
|-id=979 bgcolor=#E9E9E9
| 606979 ||  || — || March 26, 2011 || Kitt Peak || Spacewatch ||  || align=right | 1.3 km || 
|-id=980 bgcolor=#E9E9E9
| 606980 ||  || — || October 24, 2008 || Kitt Peak || Spacewatch ||  || align=right | 1.9 km || 
|-id=981 bgcolor=#E9E9E9
| 606981 ||  || — || August 26, 2012 || Haleakala || Pan-STARRS ||  || align=right | 1.1 km || 
|-id=982 bgcolor=#fefefe
| 606982 ||  || — || April 1, 2016 || Haleakala || Pan-STARRS ||  || align=right data-sort-value="0.54" | 540 m || 
|-id=983 bgcolor=#FA8072
| 606983 ||  || — || June 29, 2020 || Haleakala || Pan-STARRS ||  || align=right | 1.4 km || 
|-id=984 bgcolor=#fefefe
| 606984 ||  || — || April 6, 2017 || Haleakala || Pan-STARRS || H || align=right data-sort-value="0.48" | 480 m || 
|-id=985 bgcolor=#C7FF8F
| 606985 ||  || — || November 21, 1998 || Kitt Peak || Spacewatch || centaur || align=right | 9.7 km || 
|-id=986 bgcolor=#fefefe
| 606986 ||  || — || May 15, 2013 || Haleakala || Pan-STARRS ||  || align=right data-sort-value="0.54" | 540 m || 
|-id=987 bgcolor=#C2FFFF
| 606987 ||  || — || October 29, 2010 || Mount Lemmon || Mount Lemmon Survey || L4 || align=right | 6.4 km || 
|-id=988 bgcolor=#C7FF8F
| 606988 ||  || — || September 14, 2020 || Haleakala || Pan-STARRS || centaur || align=right | 33 km || 
|-id=989 bgcolor=#C2FFFF
| 606989 ||  || — || September 5, 2008 || Kitt Peak || Spacewatch || L4 || align=right | 6.2 km || 
|-id=990 bgcolor=#C2FFFF
| 606990 ||  || — || September 29, 2009 || Mount Lemmon || Mount Lemmon Survey || L4 || align=right | 6.2 km || 
|-id=991 bgcolor=#fefefe
| 606991 ||  || — || September 19, 2003 || Palomar || NEAT ||  || align=right data-sort-value="0.42" | 420 m || 
|-id=992 bgcolor=#fefefe
| 606992 ||  || — || November 16, 2010 || Mount Lemmon || Mount Lemmon Survey ||  || align=right data-sort-value="0.61" | 610 m || 
|-id=993 bgcolor=#C2FFFF
| 606993 ||  || — || December 13, 2010 || Mount Lemmon || Mount Lemmon Survey || L4 || align=right | 6.9 km || 
|-id=994 bgcolor=#E9E9E9
| 606994 ||  || — || November 11, 2006 || Mount Lemmon || Mount Lemmon Survey ||  || align=right | 1.8 km || 
|-id=995 bgcolor=#E9E9E9
| 606995 ||  || — || March 25, 2006 || Mount Lemmon || Mount Lemmon Survey ||  || align=right data-sort-value="0.83" | 830 m || 
|-id=996 bgcolor=#fefefe
| 606996 ||  || — || October 26, 2013 || Mount Lemmon || Mount Lemmon Survey ||  || align=right data-sort-value="0.56" | 560 m || 
|-id=997 bgcolor=#E9E9E9
| 606997 ||  || — || October 27, 2008 || Mount Lemmon || Mount Lemmon Survey ||  || align=right data-sort-value="0.49" | 490 m || 
|-id=998 bgcolor=#E9E9E9
| 606998 ||  || — || October 21, 2012 || Kitt Peak || Spacewatch ||  || align=right data-sort-value="0.86" | 860 m || 
|-id=999 bgcolor=#E9E9E9
| 606999 ||  || — || December 30, 2007 || Kitt Peak || Spacewatch ||  || align=right | 1.1 km || 
|-id=000 bgcolor=#E9E9E9
| 607000 ||  || — || December 6, 2011 || Haleakala || Pan-STARRS ||  || align=right | 1.3 km || 
|}

References

External links 
 Discovery Circumstances: Numbered Minor Planets (605001)–(610000) (IAU Minor Planet Center)

0606